= Hart–Celler Act =

American immigration law

- Long title: An Act to amend the Immigration and Nationality Act
- Acronyms (colloquial): INA of 1965
- Nicknames: Immigration and Nationality Act of 1965
- Enacted by: the 89th United States Congress
- Effective: December 1, 1965; 60 years ago

Citations
- Public law: Pub. L. 89–236
- Statutes at Large: 79 Stat. 911

Codification
- Acts amended: Immigration and Nationality Act of 1952
- Titles amended: 8 U.S.C.: Aliens and Nationality
- U.S.C. sections amended: 8 U.S.C. ch. 12 (§§ 1101, 1151–1157, 1181–1182, 1201, 1254–1255, 1259, 1322, 1351)

Legislative history
- Introduced in the House as H.R. 2580 by Emanuel Celler (D-NY); Committee consideration by Senate Judiciary Committee; Passed the House on August 25, 1965 (318–95); Passed the Senate on September 22, 1965 (76–18) with amendment; House agreed to Senate amendment on September 30, 1965 (320–70); Signed into law by President Lyndon B. Johnson on October 3, 1965

Major amendments
- Child Citizenship Act of 2000

The Hart–Celler Act, or Immigration and Nationality Act of 1965, was a federal law passed by the 89th United States Congress and signed into law by President Lyndon B. Johnson. The law abolished the National Origins Formula, which had been the basis of U.S. immigration policy since the 1920s. The act formally removed de jure discrimination against Southern and Eastern Europeans as well as Asians, in addition to other non-Western and Northern European ethnicities from the immigration policy of the United States.

The National Origins Formula had been established in the 1920s to preserve American homogeneity by promoting immigration from Western and Northern Europe. During the 1960s, at the height of the civil rights movement, this approach increasingly came under attack for being racially discriminatory. The bill is based on the draft bill sent to the Congress by President John F. Kennedy, who opposed the immigration formulas, in 1963, and was introduced by Senator Philip Hart and Congressman Emanuel Celler. However, its passage was stalled due to opposition from conservative Congressmen.

With the support of the Johnson administration, Celler and Hart introduced the bill again in 1965 to repeal the formula. The bill received wide support from both northern Democratic and Republican members of Congress, but strong opposition mostly from Southern Democrats, the latter mostly voting Nay or Not Voting. President Johnson signed the bill into law on October 3, 1965. Prior to the act, the U.S. was 85% White, with Black people (most of whom were descendants of slaves) making up 11%, while Latinos made up less than 4%. In opening entry to the U.S. to immigrants other than Western and Northern Europeans, the Act significantly altered the demographic mix in the country.

The act created a seven-category preference system that gives priority to relatives and children of U.S. citizens and legal permanent residents, professionals and other individuals with specialized skills, and refugees. The act also set a numerical limit on immigration (120,000 per annum) from the Western Hemisphere for the first time in U.S. history. Within the following decades, the United States would see an increased number of immigrants from Asia and Africa, as well as Eastern and Southern Europe.

== Background ==
The Immigration and Nationality Act of 1965 marked a radical break from U.S. immigration policies of the past. Since Congress restricted naturalized citizenship to "white persons" in 1790, laws had restricted immigration from Asia and Africa, and gave preference to Northern and Western Europeans over Southern and Eastern Europeans. During this period, new arrivals in the United States were overwhelmingly either Northern Europeans of Protestant faith or, prior to 1808, Western Africans brought in to serve as slaves. This pattern shifted in the mid to late 19th century for both the Western and Eastern regions of the United States. There was a large influx of immigration from Asia in the Western region—especially from China, whose workers provided cheap labor—while Eastern and Southern European immigrants settled more in the Eastern United States.

Congress responded to changing demographics of immigration with exclusionary legislation. The Chinese Exclusion Act of 1882 stanched the inflow of Chinese immigrants, and the Immigration Act of 1917 imposed a language proficiency requirement for new immigrants, which greatly reduced immigration from outside of northwest Europe. The Emergency Immigration Act of 1921 restricted the rate of immigration from all countries to the 1910 level. Finally, the Immigration Act of 1924 permanently established the National Origins Formula, with its restrictions on arrivals from Asia, Southern Europe and Eastern Europe, as the basis of U.S. immigration policy. According to the Office of the Historian of the U.S. Department of State, the purpose of the 1924 Act was "to preserve the ideal of U.S. homogeneity" by limiting immigration from Southern and Eastern Europe. The National Socialist Handbook for Law and Legislation of 1934–35, edited by the lawyer Hans Frank, contains a pivotal essay by Herbert Kier on the recommendations for race legislation which devoted a quarter of its pages to U.S. legislation, including race-based citizenship laws, anti-miscegenation laws, and immigration laws. Adolf Hitler wrote of his admiration of America's immigration laws in Mein Kampf, saying:

The American Union categorically refuses the immigration of physically unhealthy elements, and simply excludes the immigration of certain races.

In the 1960s, the United States faced both foreign and domestic pressures to change its nation-based formula, which was regarded as a system that discriminated based on an individual's place of birth. Abroad, former military allies and new independent nations aimed to de-legitimize discriminatory immigration, naturalization and regulations through international organizations like the United Nations. In the United States, the national-based formula had been under scrutiny for a number of years. In 1952, President Truman had directed the Commission on Immigration and Naturalization to conduct an investigation and produce a report on the current immigration regulations. The report, Whom We Shall Welcome, served as the blueprint for the Immigration and Nationality Act of 1965. At the height of the civil rights movement the restrictive immigration laws were seen as an embarrassment. At the time of the act's passing, many high-ranking politicians favored this bill to be passed, including President Lyndon B. Johnson. However, only about half the public reciprocated these feelings, which can be seen in a Gallup Organization poll in 1965 asking whether they were in favor of getting rid of the national quota act, and 51 percent were in favor. The act was pressured by high-ranking officials and interest groups to be passed, and it was passed on October 3, 1965. President Lyndon B. Johnson signed the 1965 act into law at the foot of the Statue of Liberty, ending preferences for white immigrants dating to the 18th century.

The act did not end the bar on admission for LGBTQ+ individuals immigrating to the United States. The Immigration and Naturalization Service continued to deny entry to prospective immigrants who are in the LGBTQ+ community on the grounds that they were "mentally defective", or had a "constitutional psychopathic inferiority" until the Immigration Act of 1990 rescinded the provision discriminating against members of the LGBT+ community.

== Legislative history ==
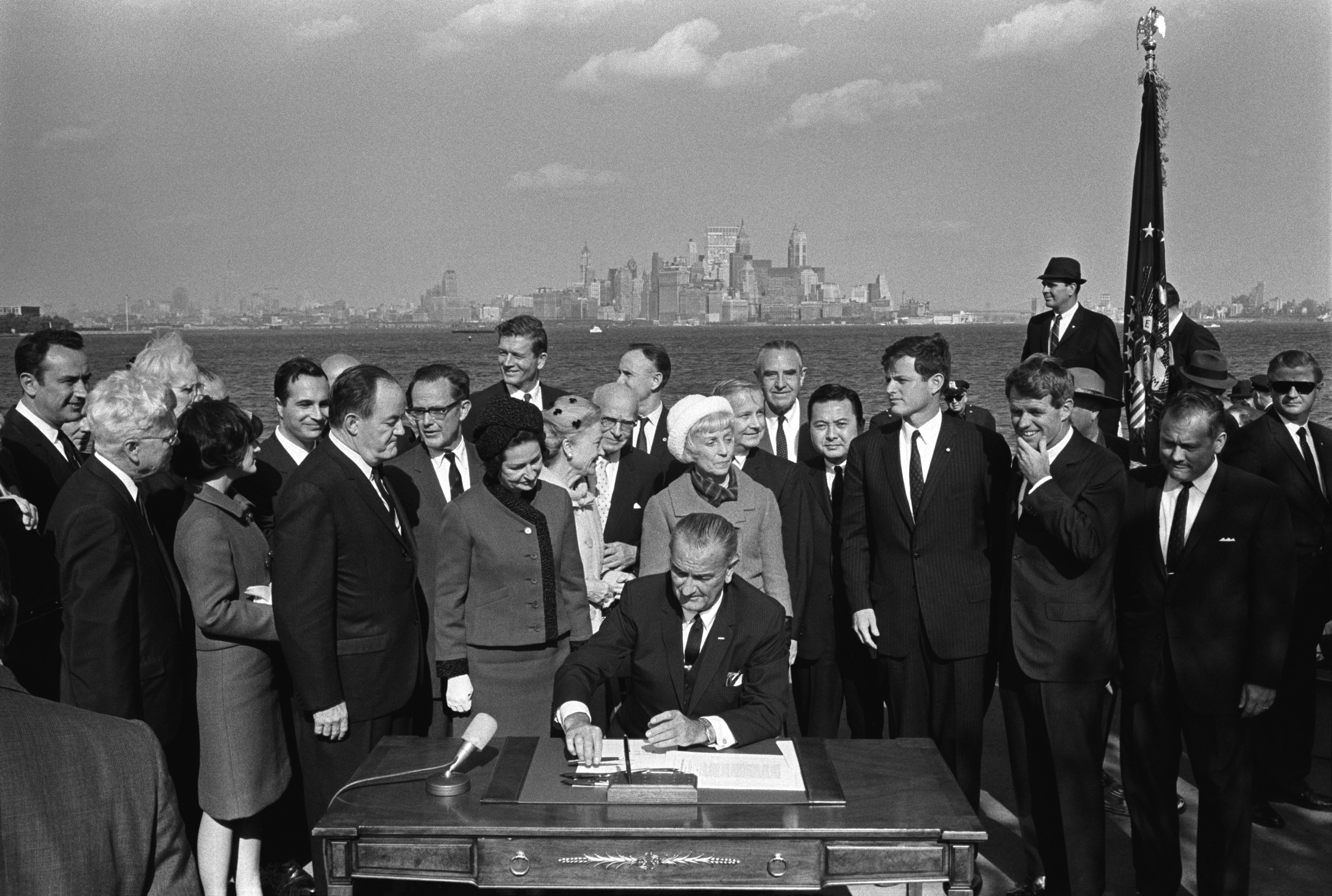
President Lyndon B. Johnson signs the bill into law as Vice President Hubert Humphrey, senators Edward M. Kennedy and Robert F. Kennedy and others look on.

In 1958, Senator John F. Kennedy or his team penned a pamphlet titled A Nation of Immigrants, opposing the immigration quotas set forth in the Immigration and Nationality Act of 1952, after being convinced to do so by the Anti-Defamation League. The content of the pamphlet was based on the ideas of the historian Oscar Handlin and an outline by his student Arthur Mann, with Kennedy's version de-emphasizing the difficulties in assimilation of immigrants elucidated by Handlin and Mann, and promoting a more idealistic view. Immigration reform was promoted by Kennedy during his 1960 presidential campaign, with support from his brothers Robert F. Kennedy and Ted Kennedy.

Following Kennedy's civil rights address in June 1963, he had Robert, who was the United States attorney general, prepare a draft bill, which was authored by Adam Walinsky, and sent it to the Congress on July 23, 1963. The bill was introduced in the House of Representatives by Emanuel Celler, who had advocated for such an immigration reform since the 1920s, and by Philip Hart in the Senate. Ted was assigned to ensure the passage of the bill through the Congress.

It was presented for the last time on August 19, 1965. It was hard to pass this law under Kennedy's administration because Senator James Eastland (D-MS), Representative Michael Feighan (D-OH), and Representative Francis Walter (D-PA), who were in control of the immigration subcommittees, were against immigration reform. When President Lyndon B. Johnson became president on January 8, 1964, he pressured Congress to act upon reform in immigration. However, this president's support did not stop the debate on the bill until January 4, 1965, when President Johnson focused his inaugural address on the reform of immigration, which created intense pressure for the heads of the congressional immigration subcommittees.

With the support of President Johnson's Administration, Representative Emanuel Celler (D-NY) introduced the Immigration and Nationality bill, H.R. 2580. Emanuel Celler was a senior representative, as well as the Chair of the House Judiciary Committee. When Celler introduced the bill, he knew that it would be hard for this bill to move from the committee to the floor successfully; the bill's committee was the Immigration and Nationality subcommittee. The chair of the subcommittee was Representative Feighan, who was against immigration reform. In the end, a compromise was made where immigration based on familial reunification is more critical than immigration based on labor and skilled workers. Later, Senator Philip Hart (D-MI) introduced the Immigration and Nationality bill, S.500, to the Senate.

=== Congressional hearings ===
During the subcommittee's hearing on Immigration and Naturalization of the Committee in the Judiciary United States Senate, many came forward to voice their support or opposition to the bill. Many higher-ranking officials in the executive and legislative branches, like Dean Rusk (Secretary of State) and Abba P. Schwartz (Administrator, Bureau of Security and Consular Affairs, U.S. Department of State), came forward with active support. Also, many cultural and civil rights organizations, like the Order Sons of Italy in America, and the Grand Council of Columbia Association in Civil Service, supported the act. Many of the bill's supporters believed that this future would outlaw racism and prejudice rhetoric that previous immigration quotas have caused; this prejudice has also caused other nations to feel like the United States did not respect them due to their low rating in the previous immigration quotas. Many also believed that this act would highly benefit the United States' economy because the act focused on allowing skilled workers to enter the United States.

On the other hand, many lobbyists and organizations, such as the Daughters of the American Revolution and the Baltimore Anti-Communistic League, came to the hearing to explain their opposition. Many of the opposition believed that this bill would be against American welfare. The common argument that they used was that if the government allowed more immigrants into the United States, more employment opportunities would be taken away from the American workforce. While the farmers' organizations, like the American Farm Bureau Federation and the National Council of Agricultural, argued that this legislation would be hazardous for the agricultural industry due to the section regarding a limit of immigration of the Western Hemisphere. Before this act, there was no limitation with the immigration of the Western Hemisphere, which allowed many migrant workers in the agricultural industry to easily move from countries in the Western Hemisphere to farms in the United States during critical farming seasons. These agricultural organizations believed that this act could cause issues for migrant workers to enter the United States.

=== Voting on the bill ===
Once the bill was passed in the subcommittees and brought to floors of Congress, it was widely supported. Senator Philip Hart introduced the administration-backed immigration bill, which was reported to the Senate Judiciary Committee's Immigration and Naturalization Subcommittee. Representative Emanuel Celler introduced the bill in the United States House of Representatives, which voted 320 to 70 in favor of the act, while the United States Senate passed the bill by a vote of 76 to 18. In the Senate, 52 Democrats voted yes, 14 no, and 1 abstained. Among Senate Republicans, 24 voted yes, 3 voted no, and 1 abstained. In the House, 202 Democrats voted yes, 60 voted no, and 12 abstained, 118 Republicans voted yes, 10 voted no, and 11 abstained. In total, 74% of Democrats and 85% of Republicans voted for passage of this bill. Most of the no votes were from the American South, which was then still strongly Democratic. During debate on the Senate floor, Senator Ted Kennedy, speaking of the effects of the Act, said, "our cities will not be flooded with a million immigrants annually. ... Secondly, the ethnic mix of this country will not be upset."

Sen. Hiram Fong (R-HI) answered questions concerning the possible change in the United States' cultural pattern by an influx of Asians:

Asians represent six-tenths of 1 percent of the population of the United States ... with respect to Japan, we estimate that there will be a total for the first 5 years of some 5,391 ... the people from that part of the world will never reach 1 percent of the population ... Our cultural pattern will never be changed as far as America is concerned.

— U.S. Senate, Subcommittee on Immigration and Naturalization of the Committee on the Judiciary, Washington, D.C., Feb. 10, 1965, pp.71, 119.

Democratic Rep. Michael A. Feighan (OH-20), along with some other Democrats, insisted that "family unification" should take priority over "employability", on the premise that such a weighting would maintain the existing ethnic profile of the country. That change in policy instead resulted in chain migration dominating the subsequent patterns of immigration to the United States. In removing racial and national discrimination the Act would significantly alter the demographic mix in the U.S.

When the act was on the floor, two possible amendments were created in order to impact the Western Hemisphere aspect of the legislation. In the House, the MacGregor Amendment was debated; this amendment called for the Western Hemisphere limit to be 115,000 immigrants annually. This amendment was rejected in a 189–218 record vote. Then the act was pushed to the Senate, where a similar amendment was proposed (possibly creating a cap of 115,000 immigrants annually from the Western Hemisphere), but this was also never passed.

=== Enactment ===
On October 3, 1965, President Lyndon B. Johnson officially signed the Immigration and Nationality Act. Because his administration believed that this was historic legislation, he signed the act at Liberty Island, New York. Upon signing the bill into law, Johnson said, "this [old] system violates the basic principle of American democracy, the principle that values and rewards each man on the basis of his merit as a man. It has been un-American in the highest sense, because it has been untrue to the faith that brought thousands to these shores even before we were a country."

== Provisions ==
The act amended the Immigration and Nationality Act of 1952 (known as the McCarran–Walter Act). It upheld some provisions of the Immigration Act of 1924, while at the same time creating new and more inclusive immigration regulations. It maintained per-country limits, which had been a feature of U.S. immigration policy since the 1920s, and it developed preference categories.

One of the main components of the act was aimed to abolish the national-origins quota. This meant that it eliminated national origin, race, and ancestry as a basis for immigration, making discriminating against obtaining visas illegal.

It created a seven-category preference system. In this system, it explains how visas should be given out in order of most importance. This system prioritized individuals who were relatives of U.S. citizens, legal permanent resident, professionals, and/or other individuals with specialized skills.

- The seven-category preference system is divided by family preferences and skill-based preferences. The family preferences include unmarried children of United States citizens, unmarried children and spouses of permanent residents, married children and their dependents of United States citizens, and siblings and their dependents of United States citizens. At the same time, the skilled preferences include individuals and their dependents who have extraordinary ability or significant knowledge in the arts, sciences, business, or entertainment; skilled workers in sectors facing labor shortages; investors willing to make large-sum investments in the U.S. economy; religious workers; and foreign nationals who have served in the U.S. military. Lastly, skilled-based preferences include the preferences for refugees.

Immediate relatives and "special immigrants" were not subject to numerical restrictions. The law defined "immediate relatives" as children and spouses of United States citizens as well as parents of United States citizens who are 21 years of age or older. It also defined "special immigrants" in six different categories, which includes:

- An immigrant who traveled abroad for a short period of time (i.e., a "Returning Resident");
- An immigrant and dependents of the immigrant who is conducting religious practices and are needed by a religion sector to be in the United States.
- An immigrant and their dependent who is/was a United States government employee abroad. They must have served 15 or more years to be considered a special immigrant. This category is only given if the Foreign Service Office recommended this specific immigrant to be qualified for this categorization.
- An immigrant who is 14 years old or younger and who has been considered an immediate relative of a U.S. citizen but whose parent(s) cannot take care of them for multiple reasons, including death, abandonment, and so on.

It added a quota system for immigration from the Western Hemisphere, which was not included in the earlier national quota system. This was for the first time, immigration from the Western Hemisphere was limited, while the Eastern Hemisphere saw an increase in the number of visas granted. Previously, immigrants from Western Hemisphere countries needed merely to register themselves as permanent residents with a financial sponsor in the United States to avoid becoming public charges, and were not subject to skills-based requirements.

It added a labor certification requirement, which dictated that the Secretary of Labor needed to certify labor shortages in economic sectors for certain skills-based immigration statuses.

Refugees were given the seventh and last category preference with the possibility of adjusting their status to permanent residents within one year of being granted refugee status. However, refugees could enter the United States by other means, such as seeking temporary asylum.

The provisions of the 1794 Jay Treaty with the United Kingdom still apply, giving freedom of movement to Native Americans born in Canada.

=== Immediate impact on quota immigrant admissions ===
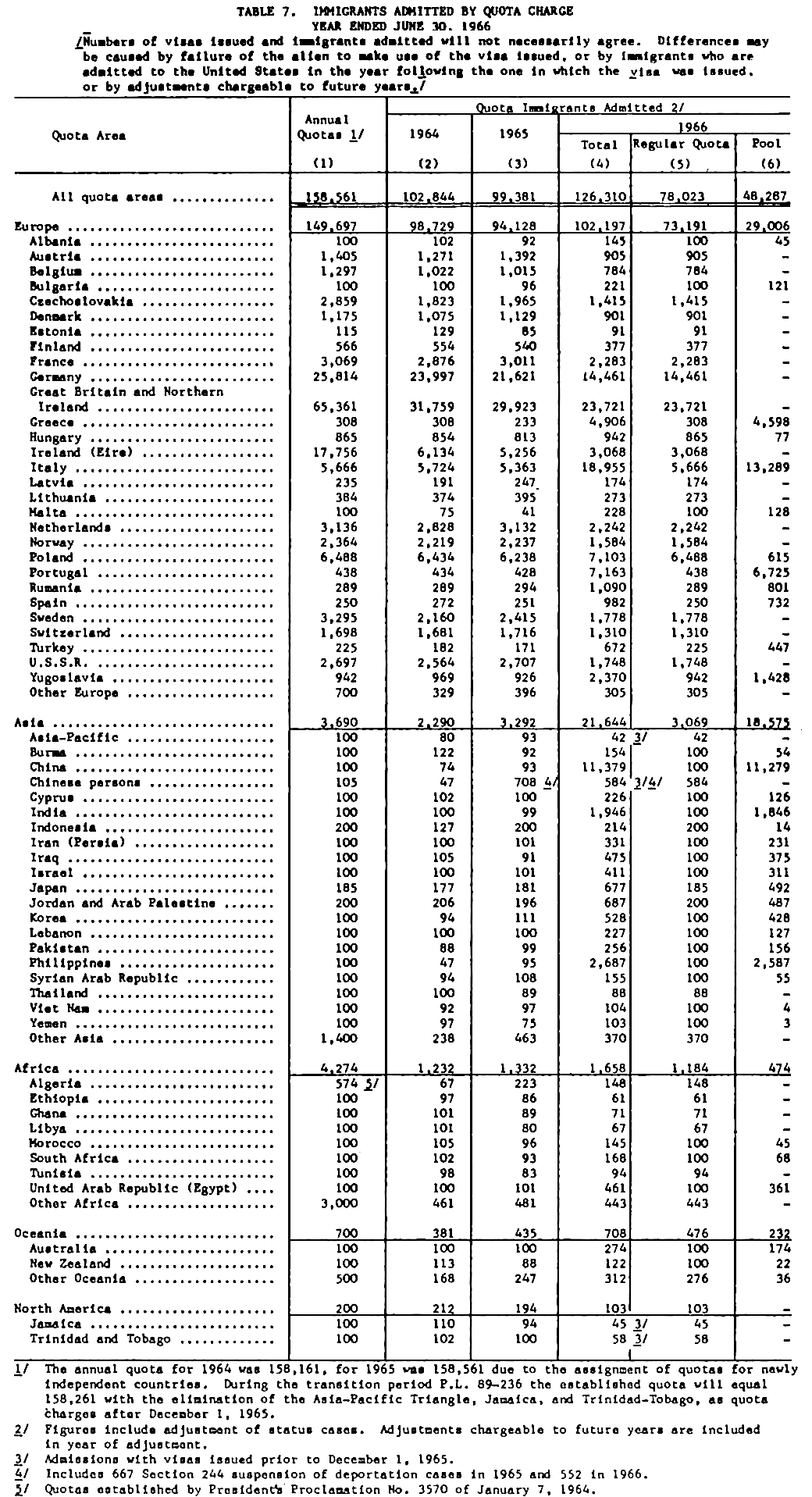
Quota immigrants to the U.S. from the Eastern Hemisphere, by country, for fiscal years ended June 30, 1964–1966

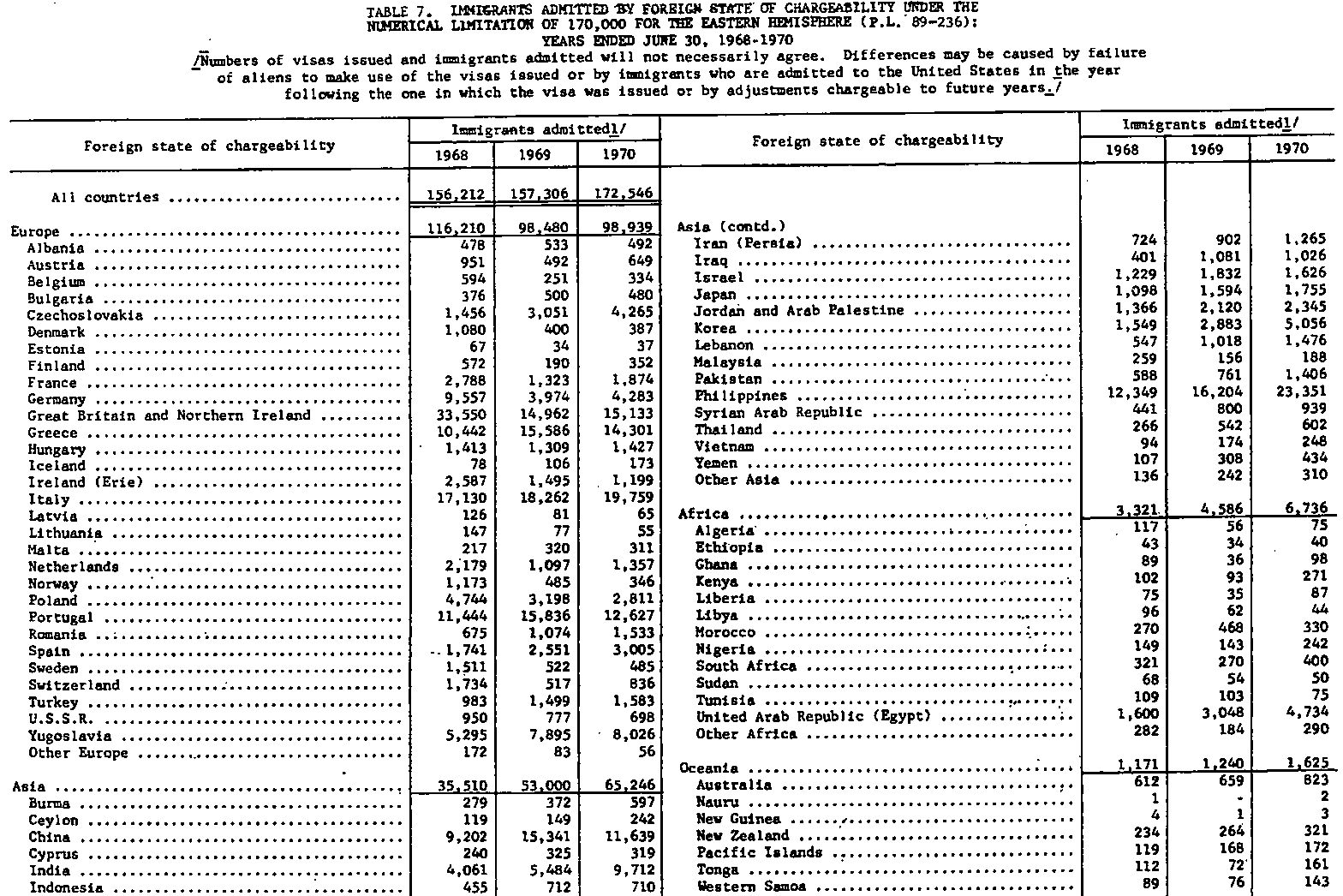
Quota immigrants to the U.S. from the Eastern Hemisphere, by country, for fiscal years ended June 30, 1968–1970

The Act of October 3, 1965, phased out the National Origins Formula quota system set by the Immigration and Nationality Act of 1952 in two stages:

- Effective December 1, 1965, during a transition period covering fiscal years ending June 30 of 1966–1968, national quotas continued, but any unused quota spots were pooled and made available to other countries that had exhausted their quota, on a first-come, first-served basis. While still granting first priority to European countries according to the National Origins Formula, immigration from countries with high quotas had slowed to far below maximum allotments. In 1965, 296,697 immigrants were admitted out of a total quota of 158,561.
- Effective July 1, 1968, the national quota system was fully abolished, and the broad hemispheric numerical limitations took effect. All nation-level quotas were dropped and replaced by a limit of 170,000 immigrants from the Eastern Hemisphere on a first-come, first-served basis, but while setting a cap of no more than 20,000 from any one country. For the first time, immigration from within the Western Hemisphere was also restricted, legally capped at 120,000 annually.

Listed below are quota immigrants admitted from the Eastern Hemisphere, by country, in given fiscal years ended June 30, for the final National Origins Formula quota year of 1965, the pool transition period 1966–1968, and for 1969–1970, the first two fiscal years in which national quotas were fully abolished.

Annual immigration to the United States	National Origins Formula (Note: National Origins Formula quota system established by the Immigration Act of 1924, as amended under the Immigration and Nationality Act of 1952 (FY 1921–1965))				Transition period (Note: Effective December 1, 1965; unused quota spots pooled and made available to other countries (FY 1966–1968))				Quotas abolished (Note: Effective July 1, 1968; national quotas replaced by broad hemispheric numerical limitations of 170,000 from the Eastern Hemisphere and 120,000 from Western Hemisphere (FY 1969–1990))			
Annual immigration to the United States	Quota	%	1965	%	1966	%	1968	%	1969	%	1970	%
Albania	100	0.06%	92	0.09%	145	0.11%	478	0.31%	533	0.34%	492	0.29%
Australia	100	0.06%	100	0.10%	274	0.22%	612	0.39%	659	0.42%	823	0.48%
Austria	1,405	0.89%	1,392	1.40%	905	0.72%	951	0.61%	492	0.31%	649	0.38%
Belgium	1,297	0.82%	1,015	1.02%	784	0.62%	594	0.38%	251	0.16%	334	0.19%
Bulgaria	100	0.06%	96	0.10%	221	0.17%	376	0.24%	500	0.32%	480	0.28%
Burma	100	0.06%	92	0.09%	154	0.12%	279	0.18%	372	0.24%	597	0.35%
China	205	0.13%	134	0.13%	11,411	9.03%	9,202	5.89%	15,341	9.75%	11,639	6.75%
Cyprus	100	0.06%	100	0.10%	226	0.18%	240	0.15%	325	0.21%	319	0.18%
Czechoslovakia	2,859	1.80%	1,965	1.98%	1,415	1.12%	1,456	0.93%	3,051	1.94%	4,265	2.47%
Denmark	1,175	0.74%	1,129	1.14%	901	0.71%	1,080	0.69%	400	0.25%	387	0.22%
Egypt (United Arab Republic)	100	0.06%	101	0.10%	461	0.36%	1,600	1.02%	3,048	1.94%	4,734	2.74%
Estonia	115	0.07%	85	0.09%	91	0.07%	67	0.04%	34	0.02%	37	0.02%
Finland	566	0.36%	540	0.54%	377	0.30%	572	0.37%	190	0.12%	352	0.20%
France	3,069	1.94%	3,011	3.03%	2,283	1.81%	2,788	1.78%	1,323	0.84%	1,874	1.09%
Germany	25,814	16.28%	21,621	21.76%	14,461	11.45%	9,557	6.12%	3,974	2.53%	4,283	2.48%
Greece	308	0.19%	233	0.23%	4,906	3.88%	10,442	6.68%	15,586	9.91%	14,301	8.29%
Hungary	865	0.55%	813	0.82%	942	0.75%	1,413	0.90%	1,309	0.83%	1,427	0.83%
Iceland	100	0.06%	95	0.10%	62	0.05%	78	0.05%	106	0.07%	173	0.10%
India	100	0.06%	99	0.10%	1,946	1.54%	4,061	2.60%	5,484	3.49%	9,712	5.63%
Indonesia	200	0.13%	200	0.20%	214	0.17%	455	0.29%	712	0.45%	710	0.41%
Iran	100	0.06%	101	0.10%	331	0.26%	724	0.46%	902	0.57%	1,265	0.73%
Iraq	100	0.06%	91	0.09%	475	0.38%	401	0.26%	1,081	0.69%	1,026	0.59%
Ireland	17,756	11.20%	5,256	5.29%	3,068	2.43%	2,587	1.66%	1,495	0.95%	1,199	0.69%
Israel	100	0.06%	101	0.10%	411	0.33%	1,229	0.79%	1,832	1.16%	1,626	0.94%
Italy	5,666	3.57%	5,363	5.40%	18,955	15.01%	17,130	10.97%	18,262	11.61%	19,759	11.45%
Japan	185	0.12%	181	0.18%	677	0.54%	1,098	0.70%	1,594	1.01%	1,755	1.02%
Jordan and Palestine	200	0.13%	196	0.20%	687	0.54%	1,366	0.87%	2,120	1.35%	2,345	1.36%
Korea	100	0.06%	111	0.11%	528	0.42%	1,549	0.99%	2,883	1.83%	5,056	2.93%
Latvia	235	0.15%	247	0.25%	174	0.14%	126	0.08%	81	0.05%	65	0.04%
Lebanon	100	0.06%	100	0.10%	227	0.18%	547	0.35%	1,018	0.65%	1,476	0.86%
Lithuania	384	0.24%	395	0.40%	273	0.22%	147	0.09%	77	0.05%	55	0.03%
Malta	100	0.06%	41	0.04%	228	0.18%	217	0.14%	320	0.20%	311	0.18%
Morocco	100	0.06%	96	0.10%	145	0.11%	270	0.17%	468	0.30%	330	0.19%
New Zealand	100	0.06%	88	0.09%	122	0.10%	234	0.15%	264	0.17%	321	0.19%
Netherlands	3,136	1.98%	3,132	3.15%	2,242	1.78%	2,179	1.39%	1,097	0.70%	1,357	0.79%
Norway	2,364	1.49%	2,237	2.25%	1,584	1.25%	1,173	0.75%	485	0.31%	346	0.20%
Pakistan	100	0.06%	99	0.10%	256	0.20%	588	0.38%	761	0.48%	1,406	0.81%
Philippines	100	0.06%	95	0.10%	2,687	2.13%	12,349	7.91%	16,204	10.30%	23,351	13.53%
Poland	6,488	4.09%	6,238	6.28%	7,103	5.62%	4,744	3.04%	3,198	2.03%	2,811	1.63%
Portugal	438	0.28%	428	0.43%	7,163	5.67%	11,444	7.33%	15,836	10.07%	12,627	7.32%
Romania	289	0.18%	294	0.30%	1,090	0.86%	675	0.43%	1,074	0.68%	1,533	0.89%
South Africa	100	0.06%	93	0.09%	168	0.13%	321	0.21%	270	0.17%	400	0.23%
Soviet Union	2,697	1.70%	2,707	2.72%	1,748	1.38%	950	0.61%	777	0.49%	698	0.40%
Spain	250	0.16%	251	0.25%	982	0.78%	1,741	1.11%	2,551	1.62%	3,005	1.74%
Sweden	3,295	2.08%	2,415	2.43%	1,778	1.41%	1,511	0.97%	522	0.33%	485	0.28%
Switzerland	1,698	1.07%	1,716	1.73%	1,310	1.04%	1,734	1.11%	517	0.33%	836	0.48%
Syria	100	0.06%	108	0.11%	155	0.12%	441	0.28%	800	0.51%	939	0.54%
Thailand	100	0.06%	89	0.09%	88	0.07%	266	0.17%	542	0.34%	602	0.35%
Turkey	225	0.14%	171	0.17%	672	0.53%	983	0.63%	1,499	0.95%	1,583	0.92%
United Kingdom	65,361	41.22%	29,923	30.11%	23,721	18.78%	33,550	21.48%	14,962	9.51%	15,133	8.77%
Vietnam	100	0.06%	97	0.10%	104	0.08%	94	0.06%	174	0.11%	248	0.14%
Yemen	100	0.06%	75	0.08%	103	0.08%	107	0.07%	308	0.20%	434	0.25%
Yugoslavia	942	0.59%	926	0.93%	2,370	1.88%	5,295	3.39%	7,895	5.02%	8,026	4.65%
Total from Europe	149,697	94.41%	94,128	94.71%	102,197	80.91%	116,210	74.39%	98,480	62.60%	98,939	57.34%
Total from Asia	3,690	2.33%	3,292	3.31%	21,644	17.14%	35,510	22.73%	53,000	33.69%	65,246	37.81%
Total from Africa	4,274	2.70%	1,332	1.34%	1,658	1.31%	3,321	2.13%	4,586	2.92%	6,736	3.90%
Total from all quota countries	158,561	100.00%	99,381	100.00%	126,310	100.00%	156,212	100.00%	157,306	100.00%	172,546	100.00%

== Wages under foreign certification ==
As per the rules under the Immigration and Nationality Act, U.S. organizations are permitted to employ foreign workers either temporarily or permanently to fulfill certain types of job requirements. The Employment and Training Administration under the U.S. Department of Labor is the body that usually provides certification to employers allowing them to hire foreign workers in order to bridge qualified and skilled labor gaps in certain business areas. Employers must confirm that they are unable to hire American workers willing to perform the job for wages paid by employers for the same occupation in the intended area of employment. However, some unique rules are applied to each category of visas. They are as follows:

- H-1B and H-1B1 Specialty (Professional) Workers should have a pay, as per the prevailing wage – an average wage that is paid to a person employed in the same occupation in the area of employment; or that the employer pays its workers the actual wage paid to people having similar skills and qualifications.
- H-2A Agricultural Workers should have the highest pay in accordance to the (a) Adverse Effect Wage Rate, (b) the present rate for a particular crop or area, or (c) the state or federal minimum wage. The law also stipulates requirements like employer-sponsored meals and transportation of the employees as well as restrictions on deducting from the workers' wages.
- H-2B Non-agricultural Workers should receive a payment in accordance with the prevailing wage (mean wage paid to a worker employed in a similar occupation in the concerned area of employment).
- D-1 Crewmembers (longshore work) should be paid the current wage (mean wage paid to a person employed in a similar occupation in the respective area of employment).
- Permanent Employment of Aliens should be employed after the employer has agreed to provide and pay as per the prevailing wage trends. It should be decided on the basis of one of the many alternatives provisioned under the said Act. This rule has to be followed the moment the Alien has been granted with permanent residency or the Alien has been admitted to the United States to take the required position.

== Legacy ==
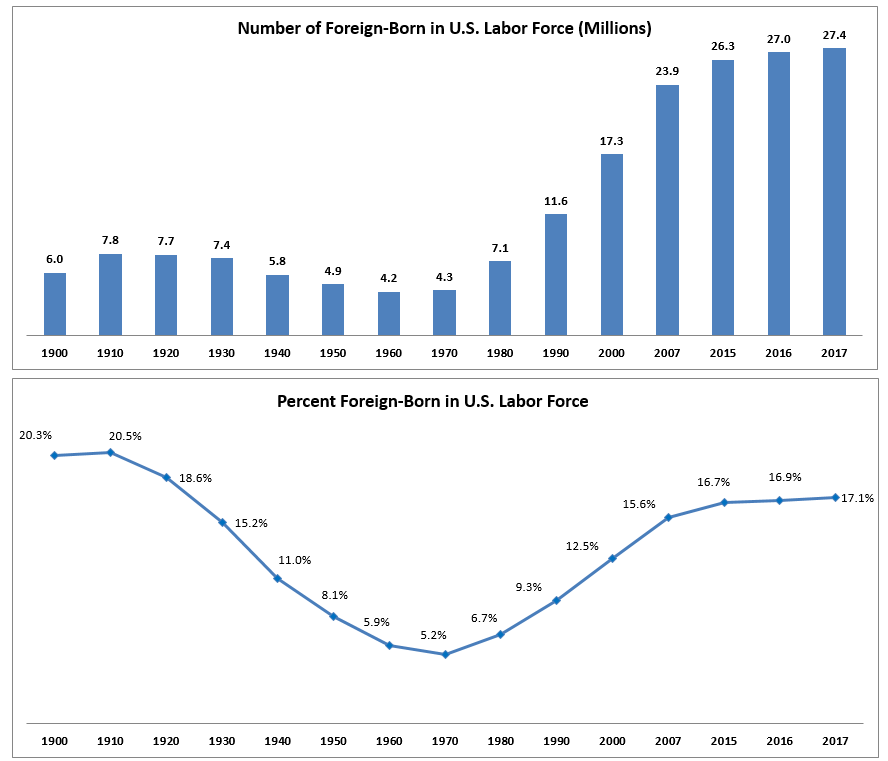
Foreign-born in U.S. labor force 1900-2015

The proponents of the bill argued that it would not significantly influence United States culture. President Johnson said it was "not a revolutionary bill. It does not affect the lives of millions." Secretary of State Dean Rusk and other politicians, including Sen. Ted Kennedy (D-MA), asserted that the bill would not affect the U.S. demographic mix. However, following the passage of the law, the ethnic composition of immigrants changed, altering the ethnic makeup of the U.S. with increased numbers of immigrants from Asia, Africa, the West Indies, and elsewhere in the Americas. According to Pew, "Among immigrants who have arrived since 1965, half (51%) are from Latin America and one-quarter are from Asia." The 1965 act also imposed the first cap on total immigration from the Americas, marking the first time numerical limitations were placed on immigration from Latin American countries, including Mexico. If the bill and its subsequent immigration waves since had not been passed, it is estimated by Pew Research that the U.S. would have been in 2015: 75% Non-Hispanic White, 14% Black, 8% Hispanic and less than 1% Asian.

In the twenty years following passage of the law, 25,000 professional Filipino workers, including thousands of nurses, entered the U.S. under the law's occupational provision.

Family reunification under the law greatly increased the total number of immigrants, including Europeans, admitted to the U.S.; Between 1960 and 1975, 20,000 Italians arrived annually to join relatives who had earlier immigrated. Total immigration doubled between 1965 and 1970, and again between 1970 and 1990. Immigration constituted 11 percent of the total U.S. population growth between 1960 and 1970, growing to 33 percent from 1970 to 1980, and to 39 percent from 1980 to 1990. The percentage of foreign-born in the United States increased from 5 percent in 1965 to 14 percent in 2016.

The elimination of the National Origins Formula and the introduction of numeric limits on immigration from the Western Hemisphere, along with the strong demand for immigrant workers by U.S. employers, led to rising numbers of illegal immigrants in the U.S. in the decades after 1965, especially in the Southwest. Policies in the Immigration Reform and Control Act of 1986, signed into law by President Reagan and hailed as a large-scale amnesty for migrant workers, were designed to curtail migration across the Mexico–U.S. border. These demographic trends were pointed to by opponents of color-blind immigration, who fueled anti-immigrant sentiment during the 1980s, leading to greater border militarization, rising apprehension of illegal immigrants by the Border Patrol, and a focus in the media on the criminality of illegal immigrants.

The Immigration and Nationality Act's elimination of national and ethnic quotas has limited recent efforts at immigration restriction. In January 2017, President Donald Trump's Executive Order 13769 temporarily halted immigration from seven majority-Muslim nations. However, lower federal courts ruled that the executive order violated the Immigration and Nationality Act's prohibitions of discrimination on the basis of nationality and religion. In June 2017, the U.S. Supreme Court overrode both appeals courts and allowed the second ban to go into effect, but carved out an exemption for persons with "bona fide relationships" in the U.S. In December 2017, the U.S. Supreme Court allowed the full travel ban—now in its third incarnation—to take effect, which excludes people who have a bona fide relationship with a person or entity in the United States. In June 2018, the Supreme Court upheld the travel ban in Trump v. Hawaii, saying that the president's power to secure the country's borders, delegated by Congress over decades of immigration lawmaking, was not undermined by the president's history of arguably incendiary statements about the dangers he said some Muslims pose to the United States.

== See also ==
- Uniform Congressional District Act
- History of laws concerning immigration and naturalization in the United States
- Luce–Celler Act of 1946
- Remain in Mexico
- Immigration Act, 1976 similar law in Canada
