= Emergency Quota Act =

Immigration-related US Congress Act of 1921

- Other short titles: Emergency Immigration Act of 1921; Immigration Restriction Act of 1921; Johnson Quota Act
- Long title: An Act to limit the immigration of migrants into the United States.
- Nicknames: Per Centum Limit Act
- Enacted by: the 67th United States Congress
- Effective: May 19, 1921

Citations
- Public law: Pub. L. 67–5
- Statutes at Large: 42 Stat. 5

Legislative history
- Introduced in the House as H.R. 4075 by Albert Johnson (R-WA); Passed the House on April 22, 1921 (passed voice vote); Passed the Senate on May 3, 1921 (90-2); Reported by the joint conference committee on May 5, 1921; agreed to by the House on May 13, 1921 (285-41) and by the Senate on May 13, 1921 (agreed); Signed into law by President Warren G. Harding on May 19, 1921

The Emergency Quota Act, also known as the Emergency Immigration Act of 1921, the Immigration Restriction Act of 1921, the Per Centum Law, and the Johnson Quota Act (ch. 8, 42 Stat. 5 of May 19, 1921), was formulated mainly in response to the large influx of Southern and Eastern Europeans and restricted their immigration to the United States. Although intended as temporary legislation, it "proved, in the long run, the most important turning-point in American immigration policy" because it added two new features to American immigration law: numerical limits on immigration and the use of a quota system for establishing those limits, which came to be known as the National Origins Formula.

The Emergency Quota Act restricted the number of immigrants admitted from any country annually to 3% of the number of residents from that country living in the United States as of the 1910 Census. That meant that people from Northern and Western Europe had a higher quota and were more likely to be admitted to the US than those from Eastern or Southern Europe or from non-European countries.

However, professionals were to be admitted without regard to their country of origin. Also, no limits were set on immigration from Canada, Newfoundland, Cuba, Mexico, or the countries of Central America and South America or "adjacent islands." The act did not apply to countries with bilateral agreements with the US or to Asian countries listed in the Immigration Act of 1917, known as the Asiatic Barred Zone Act.

The Immigration Act of 1924 reduced the quota to 2% of countries' representation in the 1890 census, when a fairly small percentage of the population was from the regions some regarded as less than desirable. To execute the new quota, a visa system was implemented in 1924. It mandated non-citizens seeking to enter the US to obtain and present a visa obtained from a US embassy or consulate before arriving in the US. The visa regulations were later substantially revised by the Immigration and Nationality Act of 1952 and ultimately replaced by the Immigration and Nationality Act of 1965. Non-citizens of the U.S. who are citizens or nationals of 40 countries are currently exempted from a visa requirement under the Visa Waiver Program.

Immigration inspectors differently handle visa packets depending on whether they are non-immigrant (visitor) or immigrant (permanent admission). Under the original, unmodified law, non-immigrant visas were kept at the ports of entry and were later destroyed, but immigrant visas were sent to the Central Office, in Washington, D.C., for processing and filing.

Based on the new formula, the number of new immigrants admitted fell from 805,228 in 1920 to 309,556 in 1921–22. Prior to 1921, the average annual inflow of immigrants was from Southern and Eastern Europe rather than from Northern and Western Europe. In 1921, the Emergency Quota Act, introduced the first numerical limits on U.S. immigration. It capped annual arrivals from the Western Hemisphere at 358,000 approximately. Each country was capped at 3% of the size of the country's immigrant population in the U.S based on the 1910 census.

The act, sponsored by US Representative Albert Johnson (R-Washington), was passed without a recorded vote in the US House of Representatives and by a vote of 90-2-4 in the US Senate.

The act was revised by the Immigration Act of 1924.

The use of the National Origins Formula continued until it was replaced by the Immigration and Nationality Act of 1965, which introduced a system of preferences, based on immigrants' skills and family relationships with US citizens or US residents.

== Quotas by country under successive laws ==
Listed below are historical quotas on immigration from the Eastern Hemisphere, by country, as applied in given fiscal years ending June 30, calculated according to successive immigration laws and revisions from the Emergency Quota Act of 1921 to the final quota year of 1965. The 1922 and 1925 systems based on dated census records of the foreign-born population were intended as temporary measures, and were replaced by the 1924 Act's National Origins Formula based on the 1920 Census of the total U.S. population, effective July 1, 1929.

Annual National Quota	Act of 1921		Act of 1924				Act of 1952	
Annual National Quota	1922 (Note: Quota per country limited to 3% of the number of foreign-born persons of that nationality residing in the U.S. in the 1910 census (FY 1922–1924))	%	1925 (Note: Quota per country limited to 2% of the number of foreign-born persons of that nationality residing in the U.S. in the 1890 census (FY 1925–1929))	%	1930 (Note: Quota per nationality limited to a percentage share of 150,000 in a ratio proportional to the number of U.S. inhabitants of that national origin as a share of all U.S. inhabitants in the 1920 census (FY 1930–1952))	%	1965 (Note: Quota per nationality limited to one-sixth of 1% of the number of U.S. inhabitants of that national origin in the 1920 census (FY 1953–1965))	%
Albania	288	0.08%	100	0.06%	100	0.07%	100	0.06%
Armenia	230	0.06%	124	0.08%	100	0.07%	100	0.06%
Austria	7,451	2.08%	785	0.48%	1,413	0.92%	1,405	0.89%
Belgium	1,563	0.44%	512	0.31%	1,304	0.85%	1,297	0.82%
Bulgaria	302	0.08%	100	0.06%	100	0.07%	100	0.06%
Czechoslovakia	14,357	4.01%	3,073	1.87%	2,874	1.87%	2,859	1.80%
Danzig	301	0.08%	228	0.14%	100	0.07%		
Denmark	5,619	1.57%	2,789	1.69%	1,181	0.77%	1,175	0.74%
Estonia	1,348	0.38%	124	0.08%	116	0.08%	115	0.07%
Finland	3,921	1.10%	471	0.29%	569	0.37%	566	0.36%
Fiume	71	0.02%						
France	5,729	1.60%	3,954	2.40%	3,086	2.01%	3,069	1.94%
Germany	67,607	18.90%	51,227	31.11%	25,957	16.89%	25,814	16.28%
Greece	3,294	0.92%	100	0.06%	307	0.20%	308	0.19%
Hungary	5,638	1.58%	473	0.29%	869	0.57%	865	0.55%
Iceland	75	0.02%	100	0.06%	100	0.07%	100	0.06%
Ireland	(Note: From 1921 to 1924, quota for United Kingdom of Great Britain and Ireland encompassed all of Ireland; after 1925, only Northern Ireland, with a separate quota created for the Irish Free State)		28,567	17.35%	17,853	11.61%	17,756	11.20%
Italy	42,057	11.75%	3,854	2.34%	5,802	3.77%	5,666	3.57%
Latvia	1,540	0.43%	142	0.09%	236	0.15%	235	0.15%
Lithuania	2,460	0.69%	344	0.21%	386	0.25%	384	0.24%
Luxembourg	92	0.03%	100	0.06%	100	0.07%	100	0.06%
Netherlands	3,607	1.01%	1,648	1.00%	3,153	2.05%	3,136	1.98%
Norway	12,202	3.41%	6,453	3.92%	2,377	1.55%	2,364	1.49%
Poland	31,146	8.70%	5,982	3.63%	6,524	4.24%	6,488	4.09%
Portugal	2,465	0.69%	503	0.31%	440	0.29%	438	0.28%
Romania	7,419	2.07%	603	0.37%	295	0.19%	289	0.18%
Russia / Soviet Union (Note: U.S.S.R. excluding regions falling under the Asiatic Barred Zone while in effect)	24,405	6.82%	2,248	1.37%	2,784	1.81%	2,697	1.70%
Spain	912	0.25%	131	0.08%	252	0.16%	250	0.16%
Sweden	20,042	5.60%	9,561	5.81%	3,314	2.16%	3,295	2.08%
Switzerland	3,752	1.05%	2,081	1.26%	1,707	1.11%	1,698	1.07%
Turkey	2,388	0.67%	100	0.06%	226	0.15%	225	0.14%
United Kingdom	77,342	21.62%	34,007	20.65%	65,721	42.76%	65,361	41.22%
Yugoslavia	6,426	1.80%	671	0.41%	845	0.55%	942	0.59%
Australia and New Zealand	359	0.10%	221	0.13%	200	0.13%	700	0.44%
Total from Europe	356,135	99.53%	161,546	98.10%	150,591	97.97%	149,697	94.41%
Total from Asia	1,066	0.30%	1,300	0.79%	1,323	0.86%	3,690	2.33%
Total from Africa	122	0.03%	1,200	0.73%	1,200	0.78%	4,274	2.70%
Total from all Countries	357,803	100%	164,667	100%	153,714	100%	158,561	100%

== See also ==
- Dillingham Commission
- List of United States immigration legislation
