= National Origins Formula =

American system of immigration quotas in use from 1921 to 1965

- The system heavily restricted the immigration patterns of the early 20th century.
- Jurisdiction: United States
- Concept type: Immigration policy / Quota system
- Status: Abolished
- Active era: 1921–1965
- Introduced by: Emergency Quota Act (1921); Immigration Act of 1924
- Superseded by: Immigration and Nationality Act of 1965 (Hart–Celler Act)

Core Design
- Primary Architects: Albert Johnson; David A. Reed; Pat McCarran
- Base Objective: Freeze the ethnic distribution of the US population based on historical proportions.
- Mathematical Formula: 1924–1929 Quota: $Q = P_{1890} \times 0.02$ Post-1929 Quota: $Q = 150,000 \times \left( \frac{N}{P_{1920}} \right)$ Q: National quota P_{1890}: 1890 foreign-born pop. N: National origin pop. P_{1920}: 1920 total US pop.
- Operational Logic: Capped annual visas at 2% to 3% of the foreign-born population from a given country already resident in the US, using baseline census data from 1890 and 1910. Later shifted to a pro-rata allocation of a 150,000 total cap based on 1920 ancestry data.

Structural Impact
- Favored: Northern and Western European immigration (e.g., Great Britain, Ireland, Germany).; Restricted: Southern and Eastern European immigration (e.g., Italy, Poland, Russia).; Excluded: Virtually all immigration from Asia.

The National Origins Formula is an umbrella term for a series of quantitative immigration quotas in the United States used from 1921 to 1965, which restricted immigration from the Eastern Hemisphere on the basis of national origin. These restrictions included legislation and federal acts. Since there is no one formula that can account for each law or restriction across the decades, as the scale, variables, and demographic characteristics change per law, the concept of National Origins Formula is best described as a collection of quantitative data considerations in immigration and migration laws in the United States.

== History ==
Temporary measures establishing quota limits per country based on the makeup of the foreign-born population residing in the U.S. were introduced in 1921 (Emergency Quota Act) and 1924 (Immigration Act of 1924); these were replaced by a permanent quota system based on each nationality's share of the total U.S. population as of 1920, which took effect on July 1, 1929, and governed American immigration law until December 1, 1965 (when the Immigration and Nationality Act of 1965 abolished it). The National Origins Formula aimed to preserve the existing ethnic proportions of the population as calculated according to data from the 1920 Census of Population.

The 1921 Emergency Quota Act restricted immigration to 3% of foreign-born persons of each nationality that resided in the United States in 1910.

The Immigration Act of 1924, also called the National Origins Act, provided that for three years the formula would change from 3% to 2% and the basis for the calculation would be the census of 1890 instead of that of 1910. After June 30, 1927, total immigration from all countries will be limited to 150,000, with allocations by country based upon national origins of inhabitants according to the census of 1920. The quota system applied only to non-Asian immigrants. It aimed to reduce the overall number of unskilled immigrants, to allow families to re-unite, and to prevent immigration from changing the ethnic distribution of the population. The 1924 Act also limited immigration to persons eligible for naturalization. As a result, many other persons were effectively banned from immigrating.

== National origins computation ==
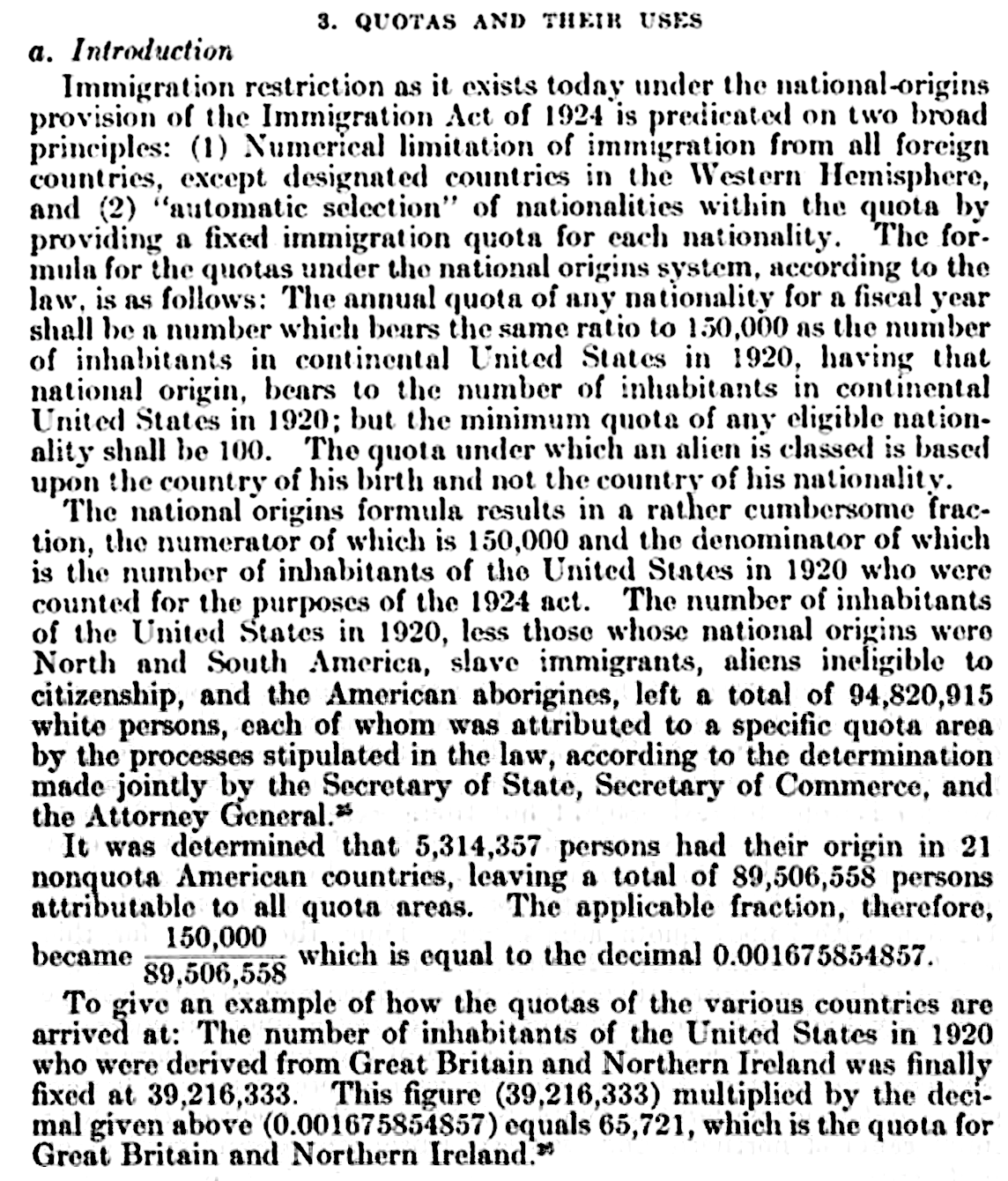
Introduction to the process of National Origins Formula quota computation as prescribed by subsections (b), (c), (d) of §11 of the Immigration Act of 1924, in a 1950 report by a Senate Committee chaired by Pat McCarran. Describing the formula in effect since 1929 as "cumbersome", the consequent 1952 McCarran–Walter Act adopted a simplified formula intended to arrive at roughly-equivalent results.

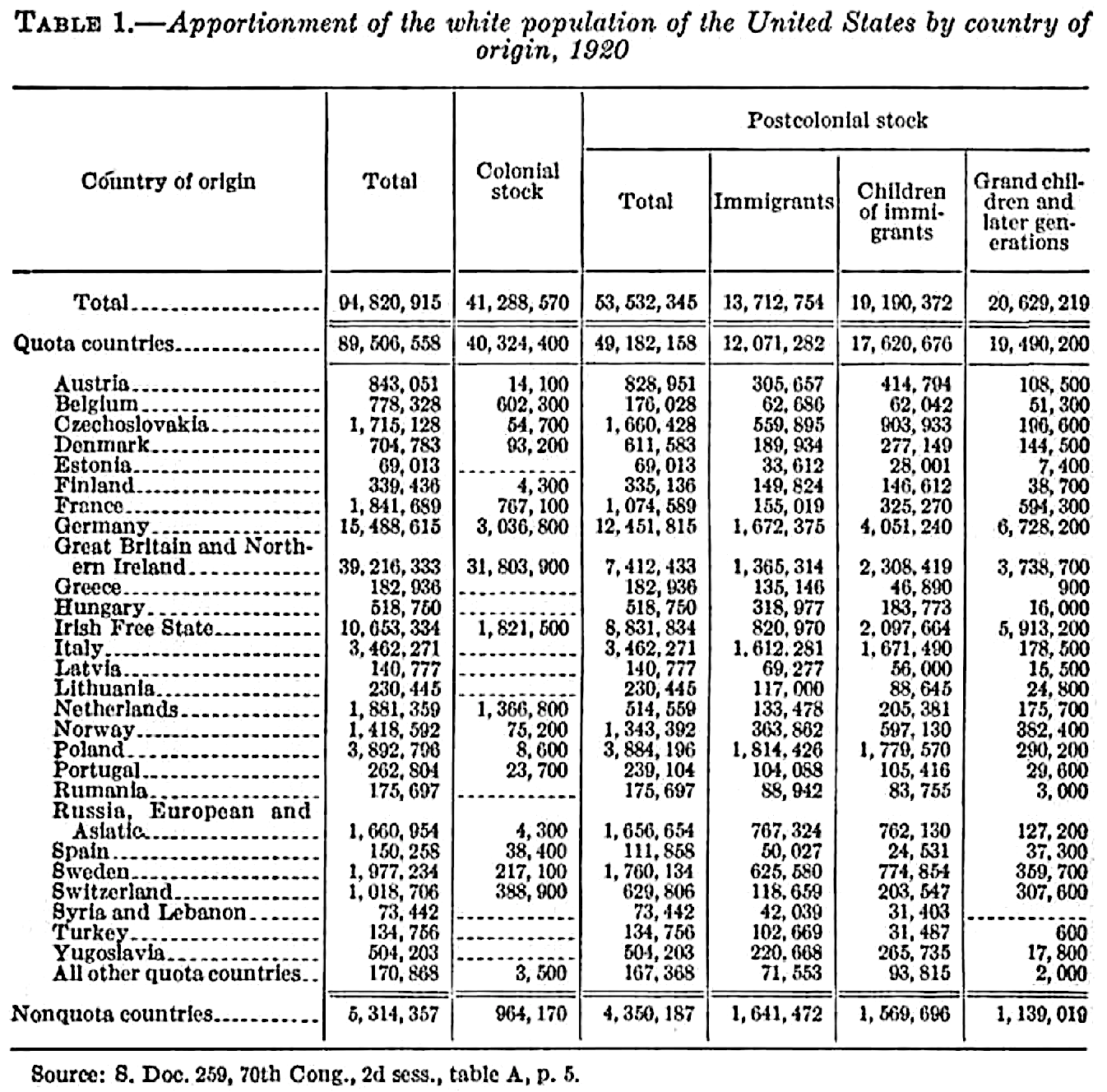
National origins of the white population of the United States in 1920, computed for apportionment of annual immigration quotas according to National Origins Formula, as prescribed by §11(c) of the Immigration Act of 1924. About 45% of white Americans were deemed of colonial stock, 21.6% were grandchildren and later generations of post-colonial immigrants, and 1/3 were immigrants or children of immigrants in 1920.

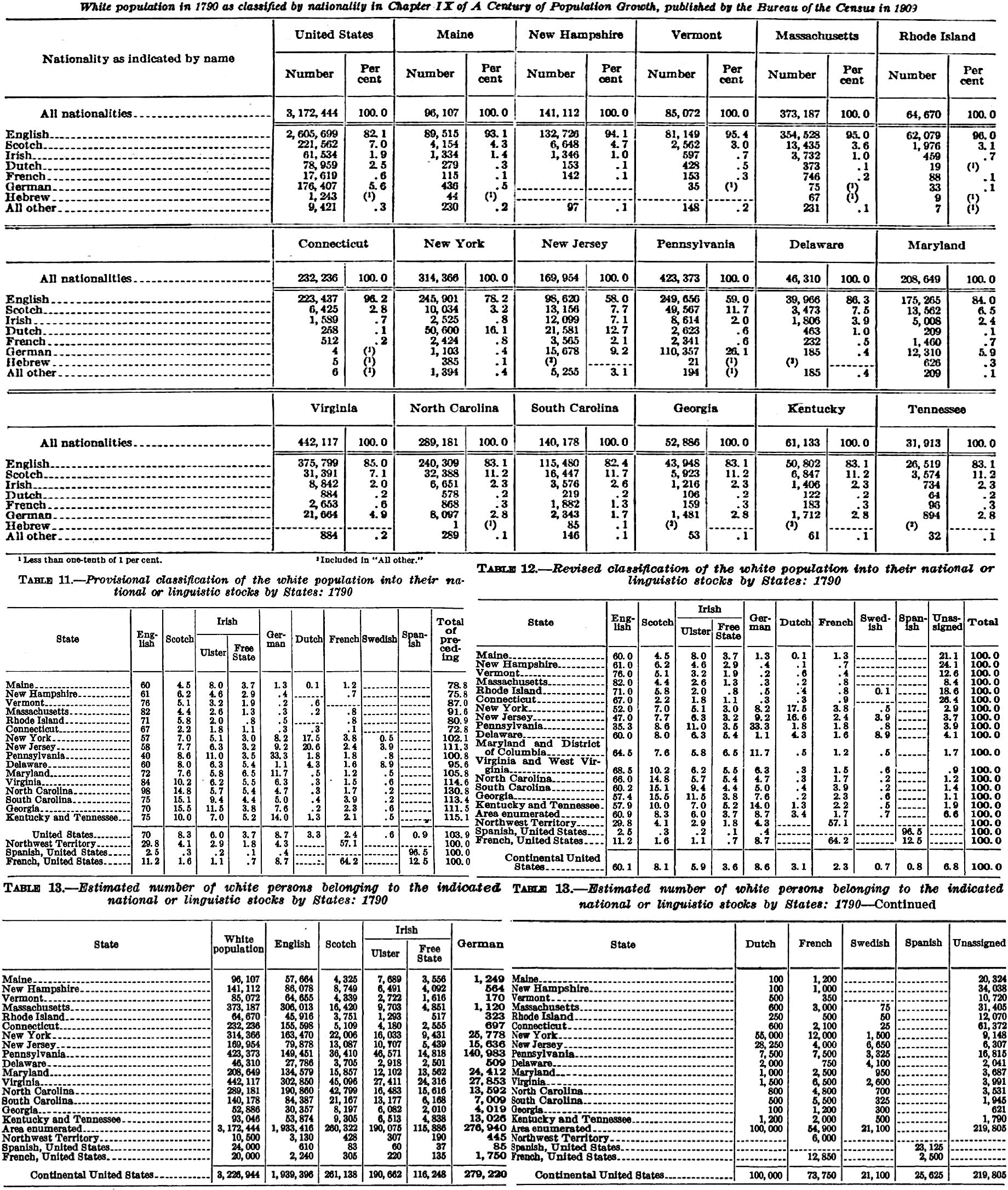
National origins of European Americans in 1790, according to a preliminary government estimate in 1909 Census Bureau report A Century of Population Growth (top half) and revised scholarly estimates produced in collaboration with the American Council of Learned Societies in time for fiscal year 1929 (bottom half). The 1909 figures were first accepted for quota calculation in 1926, but the accuracy came under scrutiny for using an unscientific methodology that significantly overestimated the English share of the population—the primary reason the quota formula due to take effect in 1927 pursuant to §11(b) was delayed for two years until more precise revised estimates were available, given their importance as basis for calculating the origins of the total national stock.

Under the Immigration Act of 1924, the Bureau of the Census and Department of Commerce were tasked with estimating the National Origins of the White Population of the United States in 1920 in numbers, then calculating the percentage share each nationality made up as a fraction of the total. The National Origins Formula derived quotas by calculating the equivalent proportion of each nationality out of a total pool of 150,000 annual quota immigrants. This formula was used until the Immigration and Nationality Act of 1952 adopted a simplified formula limiting each country to a quota of one-sixth of one percent of that nationality's 1920 population count, with a minimum quota of 100.

The formula required classification of the national origins by birth or ancestry of all white Americans, except those having origins in the nonquota countries of the Western Hemisphere. The total white American population in 1920 was estimated at 94,820,915. White Americans with origins in the Western Hemisphere were estimated at 5,314,357—approximately 4,085,000 from Canada and Newfoundland; 1,126,000 from Mexico; 66,000 from the West Indies; and 37,000 from Central and South America. This left the total relevant population for the quota calculation formula at 89,506,558.

To compute the proportions of blood each national origin had contributed to the American population as of 1920, demographers divided the population into four more easily classifiable groups by generation. The process was complicated due to the more limited set of data recorded in the country's earlier decades compared to the increasingly detailed information published in later versions of the United States census. 49,182,158 were deemed to be of immigrant stock, accounting for 55% of the total, subdivided into three categories. The easiest to classify were the two most recently arrived generations of immigrants, accounting for 1/3 of the 1920 total:

- 13.5% of the total: 12,071,282 immigrants classified by land of foreign-birth recorded in the 1920 Census
- 19.7% of the total: 17,620,676 children of immigrants classified by land of foreign-birth, foreign parentage, or foreign mother tongue in the 1920 or 1910 Census
- 21.8% of the total: 19,490,200 grandchildren and later generations of immigrants classified based on records of immigration and naturalization: persons of foreign-birth, parentage, or mother tongue in the Census counts of 1920 and 1910; foreign-birth or parentage in 1900 and 1890; foreign-born in the Census counts of 1850–1880; and records of immigrants admitted 1820–1840.
- 45.0% of the total: 40,324,400 descendants of colonial stock, apportioned into the same ethnic proportional makeup as the population enumerated in the 1790 Census

=== Colonial stock estimation ===
Calculation of the colonial stock proved challenging, and delayed formula implementation from 1927 to 1929. The 1790 Census recorded a total of 3,172,444 European Americans; their 40,324,400 colonial stock descendants in 1920 were allocated into national origin blocs proportional to the ratio of nationalities that had existed in the 1790 population, adjusted to account for natural growth as of 1920.

The national origins of the colonial stock had to be estimated by careful analysis of the limited information recorded in the first U.S. Census: scholarly classification of the approximately 30,000 unique names of white heads of families recorded in the 1790 Census into their respective national stocks.

In 1924, the only Census Bureau estimate of colonial stock makeup had been published more than a decade prior in 1909 report A Century of Population Growth, which put the 1790 population at 82.1% English (incl. Welsh), 7.0% Scotch, 1.9% Irish, 2.5% Dutch, 0.6% French and 5.6% German. When CPG was produced in 1909, the concept of independent Ireland did not even exist. CPG made no attempt to further classify its estimated 1.9% Irish population to distinguish Celtic Irish Catholics of Gaelic Ireland, who in 1922 formed the independent Irish Free State, from the Scotch-Irish descendants of Ulster Scots and Anglo-Irish of the Plantation of Ulster, which became Northern Ireland and remained part of the United Kingdom. Unlike in 1909, the undercount of other colonial stock populations like German Americans and Irish Americans would now have real contemporary policy consequences. In 1927, proposed immigration quotas based on CPG figures were rejected by the President's Committee chaired by the Secretaries of State, Commerce, and Labor, with the President reporting to Congress "the statistical and historical information available raises grave doubts as to the whole value of these computations as the basis for the purposes intended."

Among further criticisms of A Century of Population Growth figures:

- CPG failed to account for Anglicisation of names, assuming any surname that could be English was actually English
- CPG failed to consider first names even when obviously foreign, assuming anyone with a surname that could be English was actually English
- CPG failed to consider regional variation in ethnic settlement e.g. surname Root could be assumed English in Vermont (less than 1% German), but more commonly a variant of German Roth in states with large German American populations like populous Pennsylvania (home to more Germans than the entire population of Vermont)
- CPG started by classifying all names as Scotch, Irish, Dutch, French, German, Hebrew, or other. All remaining names which could not be classed with one of the 6 other listed nationalities, nor identified by the Census clerk as too exotic to be English, were assumed to be English
- CPG classification was an unscientific process by Census clerks with no training in history, genealogy, or linguistics, nor were scholars in those fields consulted
- CPG estimates were produced by a linear process with no checks on potential errors nor opportunity for peer review or scholarly revision once an individual clerk had assigned a name to a nationality

Concluding that CPG "had not been accepted by scholars as better than a first approximation of the truth", the Census Bureau commissioned a more accurate academic analysis, collaborating with the American Council of Learned Societies, and later published in the journal of the American Historical Association. The revised figures of the Report of the Committee on Linguistic and National Stocks in the Population of the United States put the 1790 population at 60.1% English (incl. Welsh), 8.1% Scotch, 5.9% Scotch Irish (Ulster), 3.6% Irish (Free State), 8.6% German, 3.1% Dutch, 2.3% French, 0.7% Swedish (incl. Finnish), 0.8% Spanish, and 6.8% unassigned, later distributed to fit the reshaped political geography of 1920s Europe. The proportional national divisions of European Americans of colonial people in 1790 was applied to the descendent population of 1920 to complete computations in time for the national origins formula quotas to take effect in 1929.

=== White Americans by national origin in 1920 ===
The National Origins Formula was a unique computation (not comparable with e.g. self-reported ancestries in the decennial U.S. Census or annual American Community Survey), which sought to determine the degree of 'blood' each national origin had contributed to the total white American population (in scientific terms, the genetic contribution of each nation), acknowledging the reality of centuries of intermarriage among European Americans of different ethnicities from all corners of Europe since the earliest settlements of the New World. The numbers do not purport to represent 'pure' discrete individuals of monoethnic backgrounds. Rather the figures reflect how the population would have naturally grown if each succeeding generation from the 1790 colonial stock had only mated endogamously among their own co-ethnics in the subsequent 130 years, estimating the diffusion of 'blood' among white Americans as a collective whole. In reality, exogamy was common with many white Americans being of mixed European ancestries (measuring 'blood' in modern parlance akin to DNA test results measuring an individual's ancestral makeup, applied to a population. (Note: For example, 1 'person' in the count of British colonial stock descent in 1920 could in actuality be 4 White Americans who each shared 1 grandparent descended purely from 1790 British colonial stock, thus making each of the 4 individuals ¼ British colonial stock by genetic ancestry; the 'blood' did not disappear from the population but was dispersed at the individual level. The numbers presented could therefore be better understood as units of 'blood' inherited from the different national stocks flowing through the veins of the White American population.))

Country of origin	Total		Colonial stock		Postcolonial stock							
Country of origin	Total		Colonial stock		Total		Immigrants		Children of		Grandchildren of	
Country of origin	#	%	#	%	#	%	#	%	#	%	#	%
Austria	843,051	0.89%	14,110	0.03%	828,951	1.55%	305,657	2.23%	414,794	2.16%	108,500	0.53%
Belgium	778,328	0.82%	602,300	1.46%	176,028	0.33%	62,686	0.46%	62,042	0.32%	51,300	0.25%
Czechoslovakia	1,715,128	1.81%	54,700	0.13%	1,660,428	3.10%	559,895	4.08%	903,933	4.71%	196,600	0.95%
Denmark	704,783	0.74%	93,200	0.23%	611,583	1.14%	189,934	1.39%	277,149	1.44%	144,500	0.70%
Estonia	69,013	0.07%	−	-	69,013	0.13%	33,612	0.25%	28,001	0.15%	7,400	0.04%
Finland	339,436	0.36%	4,300	0.01%	335,136	0.63%	149,824	1.09%	146,612	0.76%	38,700	0.19%
France	1,841,689	1.94%	767,100	1.86%	1,074,589	2.01%	155,019	1.13%	325,270	1.69%	594,300	2.88%
Germany	15,488,615	16.33%	3,036,800	7.36%	12,451,815	23.26%	1,672,375	12.20%	4,051,240	21.11%	6,728,200	32.61%
Greece	182,936	0.19%	−	-	182,936	0.34%	135,146	0.99%	46,890	0.24%	900	0.00%
Hungary	518,750	0.55%	−	-	518,750	0.97%	318,977	2.33%	183,773	0.96%	16,000	0.08%
Ireland	10,653,334	11.24%	1,821,500	4.41%	8,831,834	16.50%	820,970	5.99%	2,097,664	10.93%	5,913,200	28.66%
Italy	3,462,271	3.65%	−	-	3,462,271	6.47%	1,612,281	11.76%	1,671,490	8.71%	178,500	0.87%
Latvia	140,777	0.15%	−	-	140,777	0.26%	69,277	0.51%	56,000	0.29%	15,500	0.08%
Lithuania	230,445	0.24%	−	-	230,445	0.43%	117,000	0.85%	88,645	0.46%	24,800	0.12%
Netherlands	1,881,359	1.98%	1,366,800	3.31%	514,559	0.96%	133,478	0.97%	205,381	1.07%	175,700	0.85%
Norway	1,418,592	1.50%	75,200	0.18%	1,343,392	2.51%	363,862	2.65%	597,130	3.11%	382,400	1.85%
Ottoman Empire	134,756	0.14%	−	-	134,756	0.25%	102,669	0.75%	31,487	0.16%	600	0.00%
Poland	3,892,796	4.11%	8,600	0.02%	3,884,196	7.26%	1,814,426	13.23%	1,779,570	9.27%	290,200	1.41%
Portugal	262,804	0.28%	23,700	0.06%	239,104	0.45%	104,088	0.76%	105,416	0.55%	29,600	0.14%
Romania	175,697	0.19%	−	-	175,697	0.33%	88,942	0.65%	83,755	0.44%	3,000	0.02%
Russia	1,660,954	1.75%	4,300	0.01%	1,656,654	3.09%	767,324	5.60%	762,130	3.97%	127,200	0.62%
Spain	150,258	0.16%	38,400	0.09%	111,858	0.21%	50,027	0.36%	24,531	0.13%	37,300	0.18%
Sweden	1,977,234	2.09%	217,100	0.53%	1,760,134	3.29%	625,580	4.56%	774,854	4.04%	359,700	1.74%
Switzerland	1,018,706	1.07%	388,900	0.94%	629,806	1.18%	118,659	0.87%	203,547	1.06%	307,600	1.49%
Syria & Lebanon	73,442	0.08%	−	-	73,442	0.14%	42,039	0.31%	31,403	0.16%	−	-
United Kingdom	39,216,333	41.36%	31,803,900	77.02%	7,412,433	13.85%	1,365,314	9.96%	2,308,419	12.03%	3,738,700	18.12%
Yugoslavia	504,203	0.53%	−	-	504,203	0.94%	220,668	1.61%	265,735	1.38%	17,800	0.09%
Other Countries	170,868	0.18%	3,500	0.01%	167,368	0.31%	71,553	0.52%	93,815	0.49%	2,000	0.01%
All Quota Countries	89,506,558	94.40%	40,324,400	45.05%	49,182,158	54.95%	12,071,282	13.49%	17,620,676	19.69%	19,490,200	21.78%
Nonquota Countries	5,314,357	5.60%	964,170	2.34%	4,350,187	8.13%	1,641,472	11.97%	1,569,696	8.18%	1,139,019	5.52%
1920 USA Total	94,820,915	100.00%	41,288,570	43.54%	53,532,345	56.46%	13,712,754	14.46%	19,190,372	20.24%	20,629,219	21.76%

== Quota calculation formula ==
The national origins formula prescribed by the Immigration Act of 1924, effective 1929, capped total annual quota immigration from outside the Western Hemisphere at 150,000. The quota for each country was to be computed as a fraction of 150,000 in a ratio proportional to the number of U.S. inhabitants of each national origin as a share of total inhabitants in 1920, with a minimum quota of 100. Due to the minimum rounding up the quotas for all countries that would not have otherwise reached 100, in practice the annual global quota total was slightly more than 150,000 (in 1930 totaling 153,714), but the formula calculation still used the fixed number 150,000.

The total number of U.S. inhabitants in 1920 with national origins in quota countries was 89,506,558 so the national origins formula f expressed mathematically as f = n/89,506,558 = q/150,000, where n is the number of inhabitants of any given national origin and q is the quota, hence to convert n into q required multiplication of n by 150,000/89,506,558 = 0.001675854857.

For example, the number of U.S. inhabitants in 1920 who were derived from the United Kingdom was fixed at 39,216,333 so the formula f = 39,216,333/89,506,558 = q/150,000. The formula could thus be solved for q as:

- 39,216,333 × 0.001675854857 = 65720.882 ≈ 65,721.

Or the formula could be solved to compute the quota by converting the fraction for the national origin into decimal form, then multiplying to take the equivalent percentage share of 150,000:

- 39,216,333/89,506,558 = 0.4381392143 × 150,000 = 65720.882 ≈ 65,721.

The table below lists the number of U.S. inhabitants of each national origin in 1920, and their fractional share of the total quota population expressed in percentage form to three decimal points.

The revised national origins formula prescribed by the Immigration and Nationality Act of 1952, effective 1953, was simplified to multiply n by 1/6 of 1% (equivalent to decimal 0.00166666666̅) to arrive at roughly equivalent (but slightly reduced) quotas by a much streamlined process e.g.

- 39,216,333 × 1/6 × 1% = 6,536,055.5 × 1% = 65,360.555 ≈ 65,361.

Country of origin	Population count	Percentage share
Austria	843,051	0.942%
Belgium	778,328	0.869%
Czechoslovakia	1,715,128	1.916%
Denmark	704,783	0.788%
Estonia	69,013	0.077%
Finland	339,436	0.379%
France	1,841,689	2.058%
Germany	15,488,615	17.305%
Greece	182,936	0.204%
Hungary	518,750	0.580%
Ireland	10,653,334	11.902%
Italy	3,462,271	3.868%
Latvia	140,777	0.158%
Lithuania	230,445	0.257%
Netherlands	1,881,359	2.102%
Norway	1,418,592	1.585%
Poland	3,892,796	4.349%
Portugal	262,804	0.294%
Romania	175,697	0.197%
Russia	1,660,954	1.856%
Spain	150,258	0.168%
Sweden	1,977,234	2.209%
Switzerland	1,018,706	1.138%
Syria / Lebanon	73,442	0.082%
Turkey	134,756	0.151%
United Kingdom	39,216,333	43.814%
Yugoslavia	504,203	0.563%
1920 USA Total	89,506,558	100.000%

Under the Immigration and Nationality Act of 1965, quotas were temporarily retained, but all unused quota spots each year were pooled and made available to other countries effective December 1, 1965. The National Origins Formula fully ended on July 1, 1968, replaced by simple broad numerical limitations of 120,000 from the Western Hemisphere and 170,000 from the Eastern Hemisphere, with no more than 20,000 from any one country, limits in place until the Immigration Act of 1990.

== Quotas by country under successive laws ==
Listed below are historical quotas on immigration from the Eastern Hemisphere, by country, as applied in given fiscal years ending June 30, calculated according to successive immigration laws and revisions from the Emergency Quota Act of 1921 to the final quota year of 1965. The 1922 and 1925 systems based on dated census records of the foreign-born population were intended as temporary measures; the full National Origins Formula based on the 1920 Census of the U.S. population took effect on July 1, 1929.

Annual National Quota	Act of 1921		Act of 1924				Act of 1952	
Annual National Quota	1922 (Note: Quota per country limited to 3% of the number of foreign-born persons of that nationality residing in the U.S. in the 1910 census (FY 1922–1924))	%	1925 (Note: Quota per country limited to 2% of the number of foreign-born persons of that nationality residing in the U.S. in the 1890 census (FY 1925–1929))	%	1930 (Note: Quota per nationality limited to a percentage share of 150,000 in a ratio proportional to the number of U.S. inhabitants of that national origin as a share of all U.S. inhabitants in the 1920 census (FY 1930–1952))	%	1965 (Note: Quota per nationality limited to one-sixth of 1% of the number of U.S. inhabitants of that national origin in the 1920 census (FY 1953–1965))	%
Albania	288	0.08%	100	0.06%	100	0.07%	100	0.06%
Armenia	230	0.06%	124	0.08%	100	0.07%	100	0.06%
Austria	7,451	2.08%	785	0.48%	1,413	0.92%	1,405	0.89%
Belgium	1,563	0.44%	512	0.31%	1,304	0.85%	1,297	0.82%
Bulgaria	302	0.08%	100	0.06%	100	0.07%	100	0.06%
Czechoslovakia	14,357	4.01%	3,073	1.87%	2,874	1.87%	2,859	1.80%
Danzig	301	0.08%	228	0.14%	100	0.07%		
Denmark	5,619	1.57%	2,789	1.69%	1,181	0.77%	1,175	0.74%
Estonia	1,348	0.38%	124	0.08%	116	0.08%	115	0.07%
Finland	3,921	1.10%	471	0.29%	569	0.37%	566	0.36%
Fiume	71	0.02%						
France	5,729	1.60%	3,954	2.40%	3,086	2.01%	3,069	1.94%
Germany	67,607	18.90%	51,227	31.11%	25,957	16.89%	25,814	16.28%
Greece	3,294	0.92%	100	0.06%	307	0.20%	308	0.19%
Hungary	5,638	1.58%	473	0.29%	869	0.57%	865	0.55%
Iceland	75	0.02%	100	0.06%	100	0.07%	100	0.06%
Ireland	(Note: From 1921 to 1924, quota for the United Kingdom of Great Britain and Ireland encompassed all of Ireland; after 1925, only Northern Ireland, with a separate quota created for the Irish Free State)		28,567	17.35%	17,853	11.61%	17,756	11.20%
Italy	42,057	11.75%	3,854	2.34%	5,802	3.77%	5,666	3.57%
Latvia	1,540	0.43%	142	0.09%	236	0.15%	235	0.15%
Lithuania	2,460	0.69%	344	0.21%	386	0.25%	384	0.24%
Luxembourg	92	0.03%	100	0.06%	100	0.07%	100	0.06%
Netherlands	3,607	1.01%	1,648	1.00%	3,153	2.05%	3,136	1.98%
Norway	12,202	3.41%	6,453	3.92%	2,377	1.55%	2,364	1.49%
Poland	31,146	8.70%	5,982	3.63%	6,524	4.24%	6,488	4.09%
Portugal	2,465	0.69%	503	0.31%	440	0.29%	438	0.28%
Romania	7,419	2.07%	603	0.37%	295	0.19%	289	0.18%
Russia / Soviet Union (Note: U.S.S.R. excluding regions falling under the Asiatic Barred Zone while in effect)	24,405	6.82%	2,248	1.37%	2,784	1.81%	2,697	1.70%
Spain	912	0.25%	131	0.08%	252	0.16%	250	0.16%
Sweden	20,042	5.60%	9,561	5.81%	3,314	2.16%	3,295	2.08%
Switzerland	3,752	1.05%	2,081	1.26%	1,707	1.11%	1,698	1.07%
Turkey	2,388	0.67%	100	0.06%	226	0.15%	225	0.14%
United Kingdom	77,342	21.62%	34,007	20.65%	65,721	42.76%	65,361	41.22%
Yugoslavia	6,426	1.80%	671	0.41%	845	0.55%	942	0.59%
Australia and New Zealand	359	0.10%	221	0.13%	200	0.13%	700	0.44%
Total from Europe	356,135	99.53%	161,546	98.10%	150,591	97.97%	149,697	94.41%
Total from Asia	1,066	0.30%	1,300	0.79%	1,323	0.86%	3,690	2.33%
Total from Africa	122	0.03%	1,200	0.73%	1,200	0.78%	4,274	2.70%
Total from all Countries	357,803	100.00%	164,667	100.00%	153,714	100.00%	158,561	100.00%

== Relaxation and abolition ==
The Immigration and Nationality Act of 1952 retained but relaxed the National Origins Formula. It modified the ratios to be based on the 1920 census and eliminated racial restrictions, but retained restrictions by national origin. President Harry Truman vetoed it because of its continued use of national quotas, but the Act was passed over his veto. The quotas were in addition to 600,000 refugees admitted from Europe after World War II.

The National Origins Formula was abolished by the Immigration and Nationality Act of 1965, which introduced a system with one quota for the Western Hemisphere, and one for the Eastern Hemisphere. It marked a significant change in American immigration policy.

== See also ==
- Dillingham Commission
- Immigration policy
