= Immigration Act of 1924 =

1924 United States immigration law

- Long title: An Act to limit the number of immigrants allowed entry into the United States, and for other purposes.
- Nicknames: Johnson-Reed Act
- Enacted by: the 68th United States Congress
- Effective: May 26, 1924

Citations
- Public law: Pub. L. 68–139
- Statutes at Large: 43 Stat. 153

Legislative history
- Introduced in the House of Representatives as H.R. 7995; Passed the House on April 12, 1924 (323–71); Agreed to by the House on May 15, 1924 (308–62) and by the Senate on May 15, 1924 (69–9); Signed into law by President Calvin Coolidge on May 24, 1924

The Immigration Act of 1924, also known as the Johnson–Reed Act, or National Origins Act (Pub. L. 68–139, 43 Stat. 153, enacted May 26, 1924), was a United States federal law that prevented immigration from Asia and set quotas on the number of immigrants from other nations. It also authorized the creation of the country's first formal border control service, the U.S. Border Patrol, and established a "consular control system" that allowed entry only to those who first obtained a visa from a U.S. consulate abroad.

The 1924 act was passed due to growing public and political concerns about the country's fast-changing social and demographic landscape. It replaced earlier legislation by significantly reducing immigration from countries outside the Western Hemisphere. Immigrants from Asia were banned, and the total annual immigration quota for the rest of the world was capped at 165,000—an 80% reduction of the yearly average before 1914. The act temporarily reduced the annual quota of any nationality from 3% of their 1910 population, per the Emergency Quota Act of 1921, to 2% as recorded in the 1890 census; a new quota was implemented in 1927, based on each nationality's share of the total U.S. population in the 1920 census.

According to the U.S. State Department, the purpose of the act was "to preserve the ideal of U.S. homogeneity". Eugenics influenced certain policies which were cited favorably by Nazi lawmakers. The act defined U.S. immigration policy for nearly three decades, being substantially revised by the Immigration and Nationality Act of 1952 and ultimately replaced by the Immigration and Nationality Act of 1965.

== Context ==
The Naturalization Act of 1790 declared that only people of European or white descent were eligible for naturalization, but eligibility was extended to people of African descent in the Naturalization Act of 1870. Chinese and Japanese laborers were barred from immigrating to the U.S. in the 1882 Chinese Exclusion Act and the Gentlemen's Agreement of 1907, respectively.

A limitation on Eastern and Southern European immigration was first proposed in 1896 in the form of the literacy test bill. Henry Cabot Lodge was confident the bill would provide an indirect measure of reducing emigration from these countries, but after passing both houses of Congress, it was vetoed by President Grover Cleveland. Another proposal for immigration restriction was introduced again in 1909 by U.S. Senator Henry Cabot Lodge. The Immigration Act of 1917 restricted immigration further in a variety of ways. It increased restrictions on Asian immigration, raised the general immigrant head tax, excluded those deemed to be diseased or mentally unwell, and in light of intense lobbying by the Immigration Restriction League, introduced the literacy test for all new immigrants to prove their ability to read English. In the wake of the post–World War I recession, many Americans believed that bringing in more immigrants would worsen the unemployment rate. The First Red Scare of 1919–1921 had fueled fears of foreign radicals migrating to undermine American values and provoke an uprising like the 1917 October Revolution in Russia. The number of immigrants entering the United States decreased for about a year from July 1919 to June 1920 but doubled in the year after that.

U.S. Representative Albert Johnson, a eugenics advocate, and Senator David Reed were the two main architects of the act. They conceived the act as a bulwark against "a stream of alien blood"; it likewise found support among xenophobic and nativist groups such as the Ku Klux Klan. However, some proponents, such as the American Federation of Labor (AFL), welcomed the act for reducing cheap immigrant labor that would compete with local workers. Both public and Congressional opposition was minimal. In the wake of intense lobbying, it passed with strong congressional support. There were nine dissenting votes in the Senate and a handful of opponents in the House of Representatives, the most vigorous of whom was freshman Brooklyn Representative Emanuel Celler, a Jewish American. Decades later, he pointed out the act's "startling discrimination against central, eastern and southern Europe".

Proponents of the act sought to establish a distinct American identity by preserving its ethnic homogeneity. Reed told the Senate that earlier legislation "disregards entirely those of us who are interested in keeping American stock up to the highest standard—that is, the people who were born here". He believed that immigrants from Eastern and Southern Europe, most of whom were Catholics or Jews, arrived sick and starving, were less capable of contributing to the American economy, and were unable to adapt to American culture. Eugenics was used as justification for the act's restriction of certain races or ethnicities of people to prevent the spread of perceived feeblemindedness in American society. Samuel Gompers, himself a Jewish immigrant from Britain and the founder of the American Federation of Labor (AFL), supported the act because he opposed the cheap labor that immigration represented even though the act would sharply reduce Jewish immigration. Both the AFL and the Ku Klux Klan supported the act. Historian John Higham concludes: "Klan backing made no material difference. Congress was expressing the will of the nation."

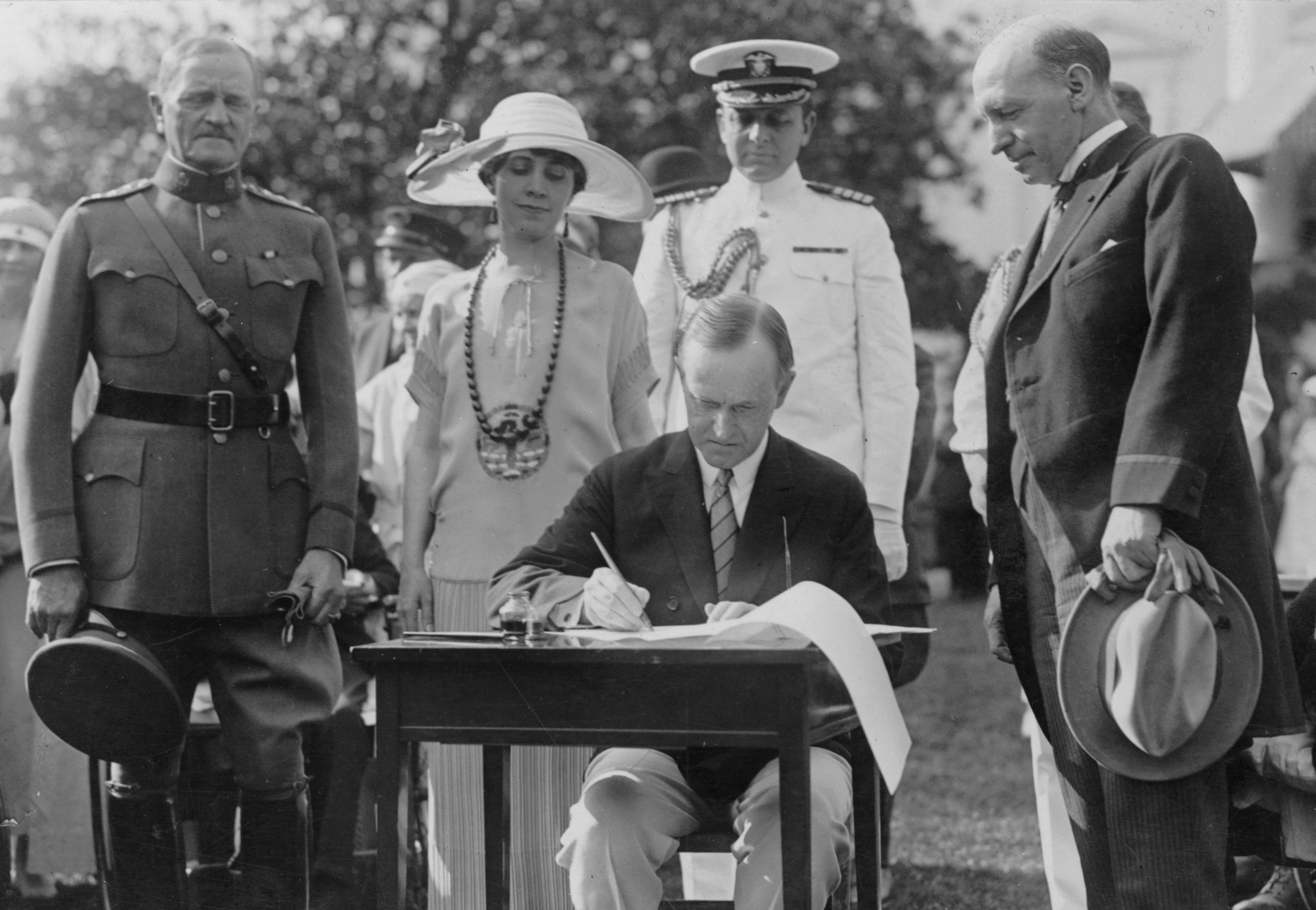
President Calvin Coolidge signs the Immigration Act on the White House South Lawn along with appropriation bills for the Veterans Bureau. John J. Pershing is on the left.

Lobbyists from the West Coast, where a majority of Japanese, Korean, and other East Asian immigrants had settled, were especially concerned with excluding Asian immigrants. The 1882 Chinese Exclusion Act had already slowed Chinese immigration, but as Japanese and – to a lesser degree – Korean and Filipino laborers began arriving and putting down roots in Western U.S., an exclusionary movement formed in reaction to the "Yellow Peril". Valentine S. McClatchy, the founder of The McClatchy Company and a leader of the anti-Japanese movement, argued, "They come here specifically and professedly for the purpose of colonizing and establishing here permanently the proud Yamato race." He cites their supposed inability to assimilate to American culture and the economic threat that they posed to white businessmen and farmers.

Opposing the act, U.S. Secretary of State Charles Evans Hughes said, "The legislation would seem to be quite unnecessary, even for the purpose for which it is devised." The act faced strong opposition from the Japanese government with which the U.S. government had maintained a cordial economic and political relationship. In Japan, the bill was called by some the "Japanese Exclusion" act. Japanese Foreign Minister Matsui Keishirō instructed the Japanese ambassador to the U.S., Masanao Hanihara, to write to Hughes:

the manifest object of the [section barring Japanese immigrants] is to single out Japanese as a nation, stigmatizing them as unworthy and undesirable in the eyes of the American people. And yet the actual result of that particular provision, if the proposed bill becomes law as intended, would be only to exclude 146 Japanese per year.... I realize, as I believe you do, the grave consequences which the enactment of the measure retaining that particular provision would inevitably bring upon the otherwise happy and mutually advantageous relations between our two countries.

Wisconsin Senator Robert M. La Follette, who did not vote on the bill, in a statement to the Jewish Telegraphic Agency, said that "he was opposed to the fixing of immigration quotas on a basis of racial discrimination" and that the bill would have to be revised "to make its operation simple, humane, and free from the misery and disappointment to which would-be immigrants are now subjected".

Members of the Senate interpreted Hanihara's phrase "grave consequences" as a threat, which was used by hardliners of the bill to fuel both houses of Congress to vote for it. Because 1924 was an election year, and he was unable to form a compromise, President Calvin Coolidge declined to use his veto power to block the act, although both houses passed it by a veto-overriding two-thirds majority. The act was signed into law on May 24, 1924.

== Provisions ==
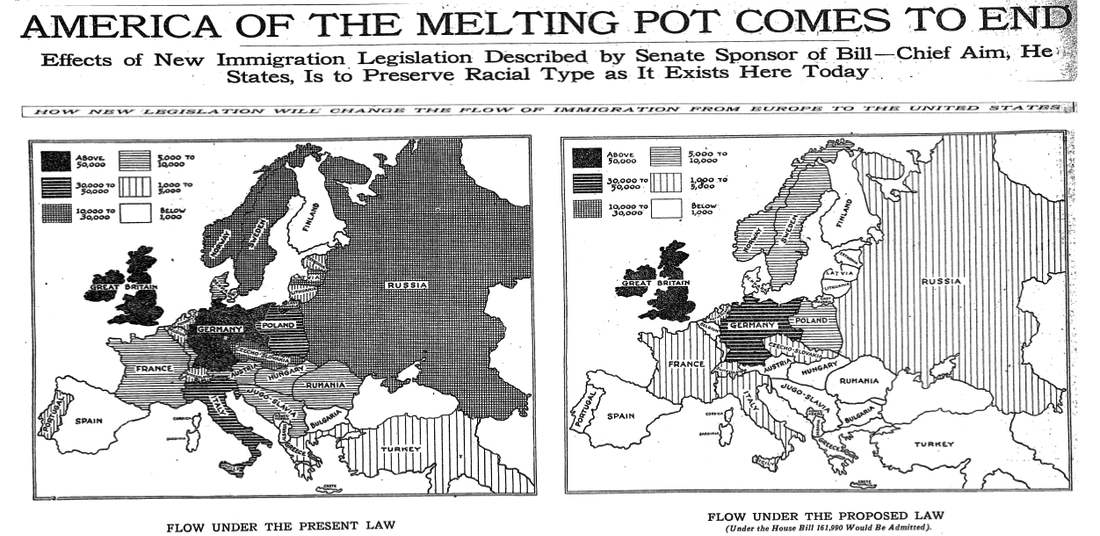
New York Times headline announcing "America of the melting pot comes to end," with before and after map of immigration quotas from Europe, showing preference for immigration from Germany and the United Kingdom

The immigration act made permanent the basic limitations on immigration to the U.S. established in 1921 and modified the National Origins Formula, which had been established in that year. In conjunction with the Immigration Act of 1917, it governed American immigration policy until the Immigration and Nationality Act of 1952, which revised it completely, was passed.

The act provided that no alien ineligible to become a citizen could be admitted to the U.S. as an immigrant. That was aimed primarily at Japanese aliens, although they were not explicitly named in the act. It imposed fines on transportation companies who landed aliens in violation of U.S. immigration law. It defined the term "immigrant" and designated all other alien entries into the U.S. as "non-immigrant," or temporary visitors. It also established classes of admission for such non-immigrants.

The act set a total immigration quota of 165,000 for countries outside the Western Hemisphere, an 80% reduction from average before World War I, and barred immigrants from Asia, including Japan. However, the Philippines was then a U.S. colony and so its citizens were U.S. nationals and could thus travel freely to the U.S. The act did not include China since it was already barred under the Chinese Exclusion Act.

The 1924 act reduced the annual quota of any nationality from 3% of their 1910 population (as defined by the Emergency Quota Act of 1921) to 2% of the number of foreign-born persons of any nationality residing in the U.S. according to the 1890 census. A more recent census existed, but at the behest of a eugenics subcommittee chaired by eugenicist Madison Grant, Congress used the 1890 one to increase immigrants from Northern and Western Europe and to decrease those from Eastern and Southern Europe. According to Commonweal, the act "relied on false nostalgia for a census that only seemed to depict a homogenous, Northern European–descended nation: in reality, 15 percent of the nation were immigrants in 1890."

The 1890-based quotas were set to last until 1927, when they would be replaced by of a total annual quota of 150,000, proportional to the national origins figures from the 1920 census. However, this did little to diversify the nations from which immigrants came because the 1920 census did not include Blacks, Mulattos, and Asians as part of the American population used for the quotas. The lowest quota per country was 100 individuals, but even then only those eligible for citizenship could immigrate to the U.S. (i.e. only whites in China could immigrate). Establishing national origin quotas for the country proved to be a difficult task, and was not accepted and completed until 1929. The act gave 85% of the immigration quota to Northern and Western Europe and those who had an education or had a trade. The other 15% went disproportionately to Eastern and Southern Europe.

The act established preferences under the quota system for certain relatives of U.S. residents, including their unmarried children under 21, their parents, and spouses at least 21 and over. It also preferred immigrants at least 21 who were skilled in agriculture and their wives and dependent children under 16. Non-quota status was accorded to wives and unmarried children under 18 of U.S. citizens; natives of Western Hemisphere countries, with their families; non-immigrants; and certain others.

Subsequent amendments eliminated certain elements of the law's discrimination against women, but this was not more fully achieved until 1952.

=== Quota calculation formula ===
The 1924 act provided that census data from 1920 would determine the quotas beginning in FY1926–27. The Bureau of the Census and Department of Commerce estimated the National Origins of the White Population of the United States in 1920 in numbers, then calculated the percentage share each nationality made up. The National Origins Formula derived quotas by calculating the equivalent proportion of each nationality out of a total pool of 150,000 annual quota immigrants, with a minimum quota of 100. This formula was used until the Immigration and Nationality Act of 1952 adopted a simplified formula limiting each country to a flat quota of one-sixth of one percent of that nationality's 1920 population count, with a minimum quota of 100.

Country of origin	Population count	Percentage share
Austria	843,000	0.942%
Belgium	778,000	0.869%
Czechoslovakia	1,715,000	1.916%
Denmark	705,000	0.788%
Estonia	69,000	0.077%
Finland	339,000	0.379%
France	1,842,000	2.058%
Germany	15,489,000	17.305%
Greece	183,000	0.204%
Hungary	519,000	0.580%
Ireland	10,653,000	11.902%
Italy	3,462,000	3.868%
Latvia	141,000	0.158%
Lithuania	230,000	0.257%
Netherlands	1,881,000	2.102%
Norway	1,419,000	1.585%
Poland	3,893,000	4.349%
Portugal	263,000	0.294%
Romania	176,000	0.197%
Russia (part of USSR)	1,661,000	1.856%
Spain	150,000	0.168%
Sweden	1,977,000	2.209%
Syria & Lebanon	73,000	0.082%
Switzerland	1,019,000	1.138%
Turkey	135,000	0.151%
United Kingdom	39,216,000	43.814%
Yugoslavia	504,000	0.563%
1920 total	89,507,000	100.000%

=== Quotas by country under successive laws ===
Listed below are historical quotas on emigration from the Eastern Hemisphere, by country, as applied in given fiscal years ending June 30, calculated according to successive immigration laws and revisions from the Emergency Quota Act of 1921 to the final quota year of 1965. The 1922 and 1925 systems based on dated census records of the foreign-born population were intended as temporary measures; the 1924 Act's National Origins Formula based on the 1920 census of the total U.S. population took effect on July 1, 1929.

Annual National Quota	Act of 1921		Act of 1924				Act of 1952	
Annual National Quota	1922 (Note: Quota per country limited to 3% of the number of foreign-born persons of that nationality residing in the U.S. in the 1910 census (FY 1922-1924))	%	1925 (Note: Quota per country limited to 2% of the number of foreign-born persons of that nationality residing in the U.S. in the 1890 census (FY 1925-1929))	%	1930 (Note: Quota per nationality limited to a percentage share of 150,000 in a ratio proportional to the number of U.S. inhabitants of that national origin as a share of all U.S. inhabitants in the 1920 census (FY 1930-1952))	%	1965 (Note: Quota per nationality limited to one-sixth of 1% of the number of U.S. inhabitants of that national origin in the 1920 census (FY 1953-1965))	%
Albania	288	0.08%	100	0.06%	100	0.07%	100	0.06%
Armenia	230	0.06%	124	0.08%	100	0.07%	100	0.06%
Austria	7,451	2.08%	785	0.48%	1,413	0.92%	1,405	0.89%
Belgium	1,563	0.44%	512	0.31%	1,304	0.85%	1,297	0.82%
Bulgaria	302	0.08%	100	0.06%	100	0.07%	100	0.06%
Czechoslovakia	14,357	4.01%	3,073	1.87%	2,874	1.87%	2,859	1.80%
Danzig	301	0.08%	228	0.14%	100	0.07%		
Denmark	5,619	1.57%	2,789	1.69%	1,181	0.77%	1,175	0.74%
Estonia	1,348	0.38%	124	0.08%	116	0.08%	115	0.07%
Finland	3,921	1.10%	471	0.29%	569	0.37%	566	0.36%
Fiume	71	0.02%						
France	5,729	1.60%	3,954	2.40%	3,086	2.01%	3,069	1.94%
Germany	67,607	18.90%	51,227	31.11%	25,957	16.89%	25,814	16.28%
Greece	3,294	0.92%	100	0.06%	307	0.20%	308	0.19%
Hungary	5,638	1.58%	473	0.29%	869	0.57%	865	0.55%
Iceland	75	0.02%	100	0.06%	100	0.07%	100	0.06%
Ireland	(Note: From 1921 to 1924, quota for United Kingdom of Great Britain and Ireland encompassed all of Ireland; after 1925, only Northern Ireland, with a separate quota created for the Irish Free State)		28,567	17.35%	17,853	11.61%	17,756	11.20%
Italy	42,057	11.75%	3,854	2.34%	5,802	3.77%	5,666	3.57%
Latvia	1,540	0.43%	142	0.09%	236	0.15%	235	0.15%
Lithuania	2,460	0.69%	344	0.21%	386	0.25%	384	0.24%
Luxembourg	92	0.03%	100	0.06%	100	0.07%	100	0.06%
Netherlands	3,607	1.01%	1,648	1.00%	3,153	2.05%	3,136	1.98%
Norway	12,202	3.41%	6,453	3.92%	2,377	1.55%	2,364	1.49%
Poland	31,146	8.70%	5,982	3.63%	6,524	4.24%	6,488	4.09%
Portugal	2,465	0.69%	503	0.31%	440	0.29%	438	0.28%
Romania	7,419	2.07%	603	0.37%	295	0.19%	289	0.18%
Russia (part of USSR) (Note: USSR excluding regions falling under the Asiatic Barred Zone while in effect)	24,405	6.82%	2,248	1.37%	2,784	1.81%	2,697	1.70%
Spain	912	0.25%	131	0.08%	252	0.16%	250	0.16%
Sweden	20,042	5.60%	9,561	5.81%	3,314	2.16%	3,295	2.08%
Switzerland	3,752	1.05%	2,081	1.26%	1,707	1.11%	1,698	1.07%
Turkey	2,388	0.67%	100	0.06%	226	0.15%	225	0.14%
United Kingdom	77,342	21.62%	34,007	20.65%	65,721	42.76%	65,361	41.22%
Yugoslavia	6,426	1.80%	671	0.41%	845	0.55%	942	0.59%
Australia and New Zealand	359	0.10%	221	0.13%	200	0.13%	700	0.44%
Total from Europe	356,135	99.53%	161,546	98.10%	150,591	97.97%	149,697	94.41%
Total from Asia	1,066	0.30%	1,300	0.79%	1,323	0.86%	3,690	2.33%
Total from Africa	122	0.03%	1,200	0.73%	1,200	0.78%	4,274	2.70%
Total from all countries	357,803	100.00%	164,667	100.00%	153,714	100.00%	158,561	100.00%

== Visas and border control ==
The act also established the "consular control system" of immigration, which divided responsibility for immigration between the U.S. State Department and the Immigration and Naturalization Service. The act also mandated no alien to be allowed to enter the U.S. without a valid immigration visa issued by an American consular officer abroad.

Consular officers were now allowed to issue visas to eligible applicants, but the number of visas to be issued by each consulate annually was limited, and no more than 10% of the quota could be given out in any one month. Aliens were not able to leave their home countries before having a valid visa, as opposed to the old system of deporting them at ports of debarkation. That gave a double layer of protection to the border since if they were found to be inadmissible, immigrants could still be deported on arrival.

=== Establishment of Border Patrol ===
The National Origins Act authorized the formation of the U.S. Border Patrol, which was established two days after the act was passed, primarily to guard the Mexico–U.S. border.

== Results ==
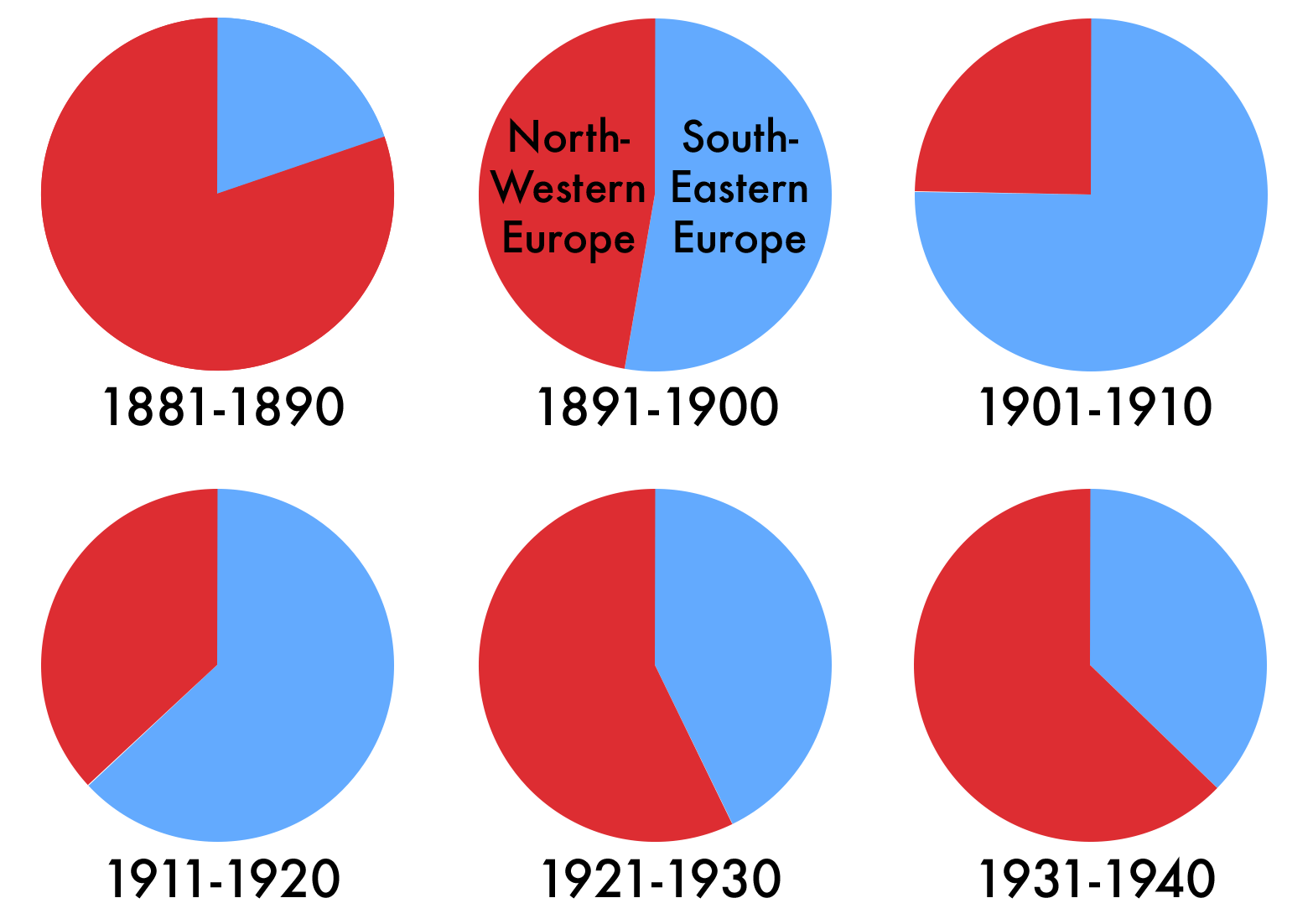
Relative proportions of immigrants from Northwestern Europe (Note: Defined in the act as immigrants from Germany, Free City of Danzig, Switzerland, Austria, Belgium, France, Luxembourg, the British Isles and Scandinavia) (red) and Southern and Eastern Europe (Note: Defined in the act as immigrants from the Baltic States, all Slavic nations, Hungary, Romania, Italy, Spain, Portugal, Albania and Greece) (blue) in the decades before and after the act

The act was seen in a negative light in Japan, causing resignations of ambassadors and protests. A citizen committed seppuku near the U.S. Embassy in Tokyo with a note that read: "Appealing to the American people". American businesses situated in Japan suffered the economic brunt of the legislation's repercussions, as the Japanese government subsequently increased tariffs on American trading by '100 per cent'.

Passage of the Immigration Act has been credited with ending a growing democratic movement in Japan during this time period, and opening the door to Japanese militarist government control. According to David C. Atkinson, on the Japanese government's perception of the act, "this indignity is seen as a turning point in the growing estrangement of the U.S. and Japan, which culminated in the 1941 attack on Pearl Harbor".

The act's revised formula reduced total emigration from 357,803 between 1923 and 1924 to 164,667 between 1924 and 1925. The law's impact varied widely by country. Emigration from Great Britain and Ireland fell 19%, while emigration from Italy fell more than 90%. From 1901 to 1914, 2.9 million Italians immigrated, an average of 210,000 per year. Under the 1924 quota, only 4,000 per year were allowed since the 1890 quota counted only 182,580 Italians in the U.S. By contrast, the annual quota for Germany after the passage of the act was over 55,000 since German-born residents in 1890 numbered 2,784,894. Germany, Britain, and Ireland had the highest representation in 1890. The provisions of the act were so restrictive that in 1924 more Italians, Czechs, Yugoslavs, Greeks, Lithuanians, Hungarians, Poles, Portuguese, Romanians, Spaniards, Chinese, and Japanese left the U.S. than arrived as immigrants.

During World War II, the U.S. modified the act to set immigration quotas for their allies in China. The immigration quotas were eased in the Immigration and Nationality Act of 1952 and replaced in the Immigration and Nationality Act of 1965.

=== Jewish migration ===
The law heavily restricted immigration from the countries where most Jews in the U.S. had come from, including Russia, which alone accounted for nearly 75% of Jewish immigrants. Because Eastern European immigration did not become substantial until the late 19th century, the law's use of the 1890 population levels as the quota basis effectively eliminated mass migration from Eastern Europe, where the vast majority of the Jewish diaspora lived at the time. In 1929, the quotas were adjusted to one-sixth of 1% of the 1920 census figures, with the overall immigration limit being reduced to 150,000.

The act has been cited as a major cause of the fourth wave of Jewish migration to mandatory Palestine (1924–1928). In 1937, Britain's Peel Commission noted that the act spurred immigration levels not anticipated during the drafting of the 1922 Mandate for Palestine. The law was not modified to aid the flight of Jewish refugees in the 1930s or 1940s despite the rise of Nazi Germany and that regime's execution of the Holocaust. (Note: On May 18, 1937, the Omnibus Immigration Bill entered Congress, which was intended to naturalize Jews who had entered the country illegally. It was supported by a majority, including most Republicans, future Democrat President Lyndon B. Johnson, as well as Southern 'Dixiecrats'.) (Note: President Franklin D. Roosevelt invited 982 refugees, most of whom were Jewish, to stay at Fort Ontario Emergency Refugee Shelter until the war was over.) After World War II, the quotas were adjusted to allow more Jewish refugees, but without increasing immigration overall. Post-Zionist Israeli historian Shlomo Sand wrote in 2013:

[It] was the United States' refusal, between the anti-immigration legislation of 1924 and the year 1948, to accept the victims of European Judeophobic persecution that enabled decision makers to channel somewhat more significant numbers of Jews toward the Middle East. Absent this stern anti-immigration policy, it is doubtful whether the State of Israel could have been established.

== Legacy ==
In 1928, Nazi leader Adolf Hitler praised the act for banishing "strangers of the blood". U.S. immigration law was cited favorably by the framers of Nazi legislation due to its excluding "wholly foreign racial population masses". (Note: Sources such as The New Yorker argue that the Trumpism movement includes an attempt to return to the exclusion of pre-1965 U.S. immigration law.) Looking back on the significance of the act in 1939, eugenicist Harry Laughlin, who served as expert advisor to the House Committee on Immigration during the legislative process, praised it as a political breakthrough in the adoption of scientific racism as a theoretical foundation for immigration policy.

The act has been characterized as the culmination of decades of intentional exclusion of Asian immigrants, including the Supreme Court's 1923 decision in United States v. Bhagat Singh Thind, which ruled that only people of white or African descent were eligible for citizenship. The act has been cited as formalizing the views of early 1920s U.S. society due to its reliance on eugenics and the growing public reception towards scientific racism as justifying restriction and racial stereotypes. Historian Mae Ngai Ngai writes:

At one level, the new immigration law differentiated Europeans according to nationality and ranked them in a hierarchy of desirability. At another level, the law constructed a White American race, in which persons of European descent shared a common Whiteness distinct from those deemed to be not White.

Economists have argued that both innovation and employment were negatively affected by the restrictions. In a 2020 paper, the economists Petra Moser and Shmuel San demonstrate the drastic reduction in immigration from Eastern and Southern European scientists led to fewer new patents, not only from immigrants but also from native-born scientists working in their fields. Even the mass migration of unskilled workers had been a spur to innovation, according to a paper by Kirk Doran and Chungeun Yoon, who found that the act "ended history's largest international migration" and as a result "inventors in cities and industries exposed to fewer low-skilled immigrants applied for fewer patents." According to a 2023 study in the American Economic Journal, farming, highly reliant on migrant labor, shifted towards more capital-intensive methods and the mining industry, also reliant on immigrants, contracted, economically harming U.S.-born workers.

Mae Ngai also argues that the 1923 Supreme Court decision and the immigration act helped lay the groundwork for the incarceration of Japanese Americans during World War II by implying Asians to be permanently foreign and potentially disloyal.

== See also ==
- Anarchist Exclusion Act
- Anti-Italianism
- History of antisemitism in the United States
- Gentlemen's Agreement of 1907
- History of immigration to the United States
- Immigration Act of 1917
- Indian Citizenship Act – 1924 US federal law granting citizenship to Native Americans
- List of United States immigration laws
- Mexican Repatriation
- Nordicism
- Racial Equality Proposal
- Racism in the United States
- Statue of Liberty National Monument
- White Australia policy
