= Immigration Act of 1917 =

United States law

- Other short titles: Burnett Act
- Long title: An Act to regulate the immigration of aliens to, and the residence of aliens in, the United States.
- Enacted by: the 64th United States Congress

Citations
- Public law: Pub. L. 64–301
- Statutes at Large: 39 Stat. 874

Legislative history
- Introduced in the House as H.R. 10384 by Robert Lee Henry (D–TX); Passed the House on 307-87 (March 30, 1916); Passed the Senate on 35-17 (July 31, 1916); Reported by the joint conference committee on January 8, 1917; agreed to by the House on January 8, 1917 (Agreed) and by the Senate on January 8, 1917 (56-10); Vetoed by President Woodrow Wilson on December 14, 1916; Overridden by the House on February 1, 1917 (287-106); Overridden by the Senate and became law on February 5, 1917 (62-20)

The Immigration Act of 1917, or the Burnett Act, was a United States Act that aimed to restrict immigration by imposing literacy tests on immigrants, creating new categories of inadmissible persons, and barring immigration from the Asia–Pacific region. The most sweeping immigration act the United States had passed until then was the Chinese Exclusion Act of 1882 in marking a turn toward nativism. The 1917 act governed immigration policy until it was amended by the Immigration Act of 1924; both acts were revised by the Immigration and Nationality Act of 1952.

== Background ==
Various groups, including the Immigration Restriction League had supported literacy as a prerequisite for immigration from its formation in 1894. In 1895, Henry Cabot Lodge had introduced a bill to the United States Senate to impose a mandate for literacy for immigrants, using a test requiring them to read five lines from the Constitution. Though the bill passed, it was vetoed by President Grover Cleveland in 1897. In 1901, President Theodore Roosevelt lent support for the idea in his first address but the resulting proposal was defeated in 1903. A literacy test was included in a US Senate immigration bill of 1906, but the House of Representatives did not agree to this, and the test was dropped in the conference committee finalizing what became the Immigration Act of 1907. Literacy was introduced again in 1912 and though it passed, it was vetoed by President William Howard Taft. By 1915, yet another bill with a literacy requirement was passed. It was vetoed by President Woodrow Wilson because he felt that literacy tests denied equal opportunity to those who had not been educated.

As early as 1882, previous immigration acts had levied head taxes on aliens entering the country to offset the cost of their care if they became indigent. These acts excluded immigrants from Canada or Mexico, as did subsequent amendments to the amount of the head tax. The Immigration Act of 1882 prohibited entry to the US for convicts, indigent people who could not provide for their own care, prostitutes, and lunatics or idiots. The Alien Contract Labor Law of 1885 prohibited employers from contracting with foreign laborers and bringing them into the US, though US employers continued to recruit Mexican contract laborers assuming they would just return home. After the assassination of President William McKinley by the anarchist Leon Czolgosz on September 6, 1901, several immigration Acts were passed which broadened the defined categories of "undesireables." The Immigration Act of 1903 expanded barred categories to include anarchists, epileptics and those who had had episodes of insanity. Those who had infectious diseases and those who had physical or mental disabilities which would hamper their ability to work were added to the list of excluded immigrants in the Immigration Act of 1907.

Anxiety over the fragmentation of American cultural identity led to many laws aimed at stemming the "Yellow Peril," the perceived threat of Asian societies replacing the American identity. Laws restricting Asian immigration to the United States had first appeared in California as state laws. With the enactment of the Naturalization Act of 1870, which denied citizenship to Chinese immigrants and forbade all Chinese women, exclusionary policies moved into the federal sphere. Exclusion of women aimed to cement a bachelor society, making Chinese men unable to form families and thus, transient, temporary immigrants. Barred categories expanded with the Page Act of 1875, which established that Chinese, Japanese, and oriental bonded labor, convicts, and prostitutes were forbidden entry to the US. The Chinese Exclusion Act of 1882 barred Chinese people from entering the US and the Gentlemen's Agreement of 1907 was made with Japan to reduce Japanese immigration to the US.

== Provisions ==
On February 5, 1917, the Immigration Act of 1917 was passed by the 64th United States Congress with an overwhelming majority, overriding President Woodrow Wilson's December 14, 1916, veto. This act added to and consolidated the list of undesirables banned from entering the country, including: alcoholics, anarchists, contract laborers, criminals, convicts, epileptics, "feebleminded persons", "idiots", "illiterates", "imbeciles", "insane persons", "paupers", "persons afflicted with contagious disease", "persons being mentally or physically defective", "persons with constitutional psychopathic inferiority", "political radicals", polygamists, prostitutes, and vagrants.

A card used by immigration officers to test the literacy of immigrants. The immigrant was supposed to read the top portion out loud in the presence of an interpreter. Available in multiple languages.

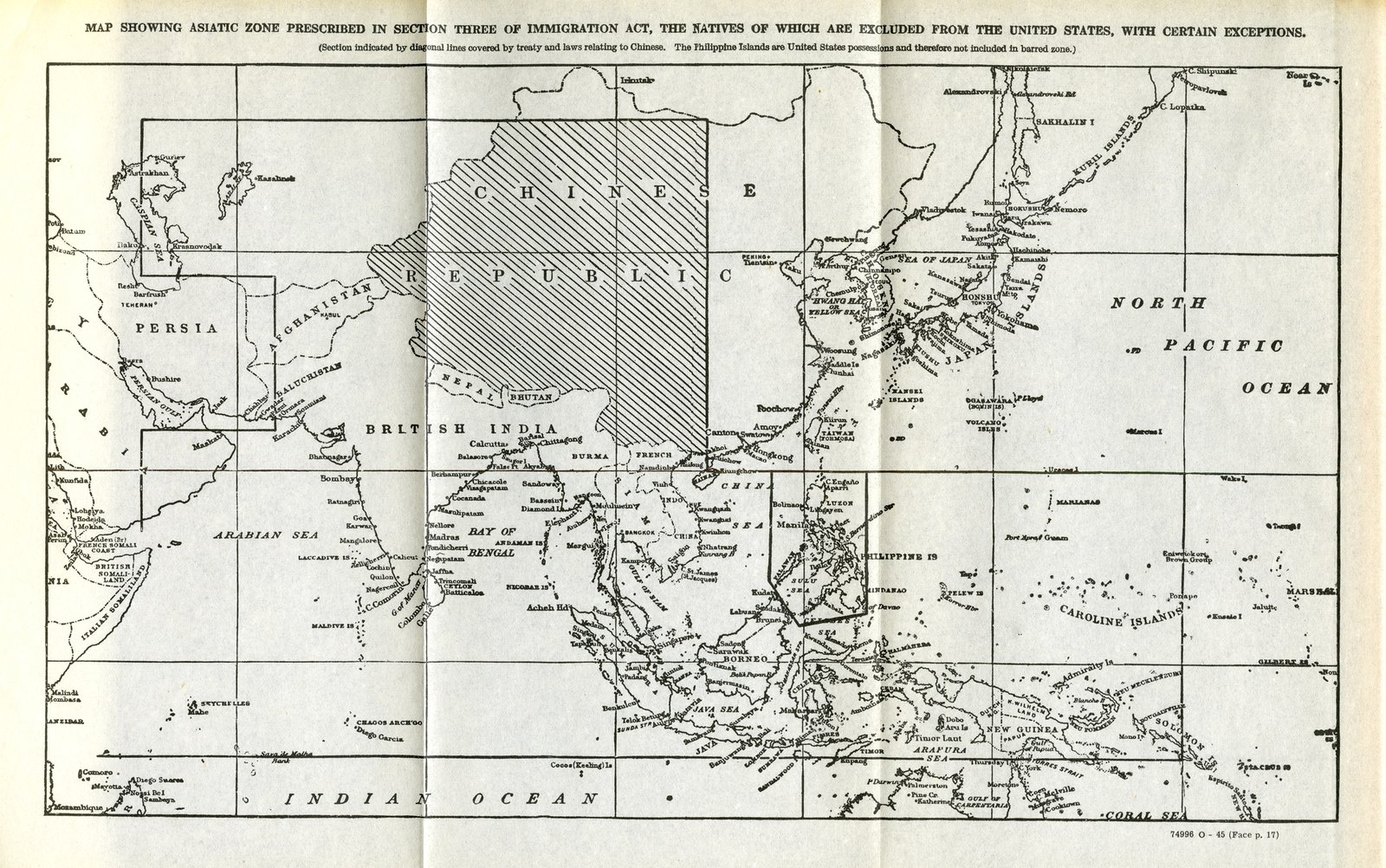
Map showing Asiatic zone prescribed in section three of Immigration Act, the natives of which are excluded from the United States, with certain exceptions. To contain the so-called "Yellow Peril", the Immigration Act of 1917 established the "Asiatic Barred Zone", from which the US admitted no immigrants. (Note: The Philippines was a US colony, so its citizens were US nationals and could travel freely to the US.)

For the first time, an immigration law of the US affected European immigration, with the provision barring all immigrants over the age of sixteen who were illiterate. Literacy was defined as the ability to read 30–40 words of their own language from an ordinary text. The act reaffirmed the ban on contracted labor, but made a provision for temporary labor. This allowed laborers to obtain temporary permits because they were inadmissible as immigrants. The waiver program allowed continued recruitment of Mexican agricultural and railroad workers. Legal interpretation on the terms "mentally defective" and "persons with constitutional psychopathic inferiority" effectively included a ban on homosexual immigrants who admitted their sexual orientation.

One section of the law designated an "Asiatic Barred Zone" from which people could not immigrate, including much of Asia and the Pacific Islands. The zone, defined through longitudinal and latitudinal coordinates, excluded immigrants from China, British India, Afghanistan, Arabia, Burma (Myanmar), Siam (Thailand), the Malay States, the Dutch East Indies, the Soviet Union east of the Ural Mountains, and most Polynesian islands. Neither the Philippines nor Japan was included in the Asiatic Barred Zone. The description of the zone is as follows:

...unless otherwise provided for by existing treaties, persons who are natives of islands not possessed by the United States adjacent to the continent of Asia, situated south of the twentieth parallel latitude north, west of the one hundred and sixtieth meridian of longitude east from Greenwich, and north of the tenth parallel of latitude south, or who are natives of any country, province, or dependency situated on the continent of Asia west of the one hundred and tenth meridian of longitude east from Greenwich and east of the fiftieth meridian of longitude east from Greenwich and south of the fiftieth parallel of latitude north, except that portion of said territory situate between the fiftieth and the sixth-fourth meridians of longitude east from Greenwich and the twenty-fourth and thirty-eight parallels of latitude north, and no alien now in any way excluded from, or prevented from entering, the United States shall be admitted to the United States.

The 1917 Asian exclusions did not apply to those working in certain professional occupations and their immediate families: "(1) Government officers, (2) ministers or religious teachers, (3) missionaries, (4) lawyers, (5) physicians, (6) chemists, (7) civil engineers, (8) teachers, (9) students, (10) authors, (11) artists, (12) merchants, and (13) travelers for curiosity or pleasure".

The law also increased the head tax to $8 per person, and ended the exclusion of Mexican workers from the head tax.

== Aftermath ==
Almost immediately, the provisions of the law were challenged by southwestern businesses. US entry into World War I, a few months after the law's passage, prompted a waiver of the act's provisions on Mexican agricultural workers. It was soon extended to include Mexicans working in the mining and railroad industries; these exemptions continued through 1921. The act was modified by the Immigration Act of 1924, which imposed general quotas on the Eastern Hemisphere and extended the Asiatic Barred Zone to Japan. During World War II, the US modified the immigration acts with quotas for their allies in China and the Philippines. The Luce–Celler Act of 1946 ended discrimination against Asian Indians and Filipinos, who were accorded the right to naturalization, and allowed a quota of 100 immigrants per year.

The Immigration Act of 1917 was later altered formally by the Immigration and Nationality Act of 1952, known as the McCarran–Walter Act. McCarren–Walter extended the privilege of naturalization to Japanese, Koreans, and other Asians, revised all previous laws and regulations regarding immigration, naturalization, and nationality, and collected them into one comprehensive statute. Legislation barring homosexuals as immigrants remained part of the immigration code until passage of the Immigration Act of 1990.

== See also ==
- Chinese Exclusion Act
- History of immigration to the United States
- Immigration Act of 1903
- Immigration Act of 1924
- Palmer raids
