= List of United States immigration and nationality laws =

Many acts of Congress and executive actions relating to immigration to the United States and citizenship of the United States have been enacted in the United States. Most immigration and nationality laws are codified in Title 8 of the United States Code.

== Acts of Congress ==
Year	Title	Description	Public law
1790	Naturalization Act of 1790	Established the rules for naturalized citizenship, as per Article 1, Section 8 of the Constitution. Citizenship was limited to white persons, with no other restriction on non-whites.	Pub. L. 1–3
1795	Naturalization Act of 1795	Lengthened required residency to become citizen.	Pub. L. 3–20
1798	Naturalization Act of 1798	Extended the duration of residence required for immigrants to become citizens to 14 years.	Pub. L. 5–54
1798	Alien Friends Act	Authorized the president to deport any resident immigrant considered "dangerous to the peace and safety of the United States." It was activated June 25, 1798, with a two-year expiration date.	
1798	Alien Enemies Act	Authorized the president to apprehend and deport resident aliens if their home countries were at war with the United States of America. Enacted July 6, 1798, and providing no sunset provision, the act remains intact today as R.S. § 4067-4070 (50 U.S.C. 21-24)	
1802	Naturalization Law of 1802	Repealed the Naturalization Act of 1798.	Pub. L. 7–28
1819	Steerage Act of 1819	Required ship captains to report on all passengers entering the United States by port.	Pub. L. 15–46
1855	Carriage of Passengers Act of 1855		Pub. L. 33–213
1864	An Act to Encourage Immigration	The first major law to encourage immigration	Pub. L. 38–246
1866	Civil Rights Act of 1866	Established birthright citizenship in the United States	
1866	(No short title)	Sent the Fourteenth Amendment to the United States Constitution for ratification by the states. The amendment was ratified in 1868, establishing birthright citizenship as constitutional law under the Citizenship Clause.	
1868	Expatriation Act of 1868	Affirmed the right to relinquish American nationality.	
1870	Naturalization Act of 1870	Extended the naturalization process to "aliens of African nativity and to persons of African descent."; Other non-whites were not included in this act and remained excluded from naturalization, per the Naturalization Act of 1790	Pub. L. 41–254
1875	Page Act of 1875	Prohibited the immigration of coolie laborers and prostitutes from East Asia, and also anyone convicted of a criminal offense in their country of origin.	Pub. L. 43–141
1882	Chinese Exclusion Act	Restricted immigration of Chinese laborers for 10 years and provided for the deportation of those whom immigrated in violation of the Act.; Prohibited Chinese naturalization.; The Act was "a response to racism [in America] and to anxiety about threats from cheap labor [from China]."	Pub. L. 47–126
1882	Passenger Act of 1882		Pub. L. 47–374
1882	Immigration Act of 1882	Imposed a 50 cent head tax to fund immigration officials.	Pub. L. 47–376
1885	Alien Contract Labor Law	Prohibited the importation and migration of foreigners and aliens under contract or agreement to perform labor in the United States	Pub. L. 48–164
1887	Payson Act of 1887	Restricted ownership of land to citizens and those undergoing naturalization.	Pub. L. 49–340
1888	Scott Act	Prohibited Chinese people that had resided in America from returning after leaving.	Pub. L. 50–1064
1888	(No short title)	Authorized the federal government to deport illegal immigrants within one year of their entry to the United States.	
1891	Immigration Act of 1891	First comprehensive immigration laws for the US.; Bureau of Immigration set up in the Treasury Dept.; Immigration Bureau directed to deport illegal immigrants; Empowered "the superintendent of immigration to enforce immigration laws".; Prohibited polygamists and those with contagious diseases from entering the United States.; Expanded immigration enforcement to land borders.	Pub. L. 51–551
1892	Geary Act	Extended and strengthened the Chinese Exclusion Act.	Pub. L. 52–60
1893	(No short title)	Required additional information about individuals entering the United States.	
1903	Anarchist Exclusion Act	Added four inadmissible classes: anarchists, people with epilepsy, beggars, and importers of prostitutes	Pub. L. 57–162
1906	Naturalization Act of 1906	Standardized naturalization procedures; Made some knowledge of English a requirement for citizenship; Established the Bureau of Immigration and Naturalization	Pub. L. 59–338
1907	Immigration Act of 1907	Restricted immigration for certain classes of disabled and diseased people	Pub. L. 59–96
1907	Expatriation Act of 1907		
1917	Immigration Act of 1917 (Barred Zone Act)	Restricted immigration from Asia by creating an "Asiatic Barred Zone" and introduced a literacy test for all immigrants over sixteen years of age, with certain exceptions for children, wives, and elderly family members.	Pub. L. 64–301
1917	Jones–Shafroth Act	Included a provision extending birthright citizenship to anyone born in Puerto Rico after April 11, 1899.	Pub. L. 64–368
1918	Immigration Act of 1918	Expanded on the provisions of the Anarchist Exclusion Act.	Pub. L. 65–221
1920	Passport Act of 1920		Pub. L. 66–238
1921	Emergency Quota Act	Limited the number of immigrants a year from any country to 3% of those already in the US from that country as per the 1910 census, establishing the National Origins Formula.; "An unintended consequence of the 1920s legislation was an increase in illegal immigration. Many Europeans who did not fall under the quotas migrated to Canada or Mexico, which [as Western Hemisphere nations] were not subject to national-origin quotas; [and] subsequently they slipped into the United States illegally."	Pub. L. 67–5
1922	The Cable Act of 1922 (Married Women's Independent Nationality Act)	Reversed former immigration laws regarding marriage, also known as the Married Women's Citizenship Act or the Women's Citizenship Act. Previously, a woman lost her US citizenship if she married a foreign man, since she assumed the citizenship of her husband, a law that did not apply to men who married foreign women. The law repealed sections 3 and 4 of the Expatriation Act of 1907.	Pub. L. 67–346
1924	Immigration Act of 1924 (Johnson-Reed Act)	Created the United States Border Patrol.; Imposed first permanent numerical limit on immigration.; Began a national-origin quota system.; Total annual immigration was capped at 150,000. Immigrants fit into two categories: those from quota-nations and those from non-quota nations.; Immigrant visas from quota-nations were restricted to the same ratio of residents from the country of origin out of 150,000 as the ratio of foreign-born nationals in the United States. The percentage out of 150,000 was the relative number of visas a particular nation received.; Non-quota nations, notably those contiguous to the United States only had to prove an immigrant's residence in that country of origin for at least two years prior to emigration to the United States.; Laborers from Asiatic nations were excluded but exceptions existed for professionals, clergy, and students to obtain visas.	Pub. L. 68–139
1924	Indian Citizenship Act	Granted citizenship to Native Americans in the United States.	Pub. L. 68–175
1926	Passport Act of 1926		Pub. L. 69–493
1934	Tydings–McDuffie Act	Granted independence to the Philippines territory. Recognized all Filipinos as foreigners. Established a quota of 50 Filipino immigrants annually.	Pub. L. 73–127
1934	Equal Nationality Act of 1934	Allowed foreign-born children of American mothers and alien fathers who had entered America before age 18 and lived in America for five years to apply for American citizenship for the first time.; Made the naturalization process quicker for American women's alien husbands.	
1940	Alien Registration Act (Smith Act)	Included a requirement that non-citizen residents register with the government and be fingerprinted.	Pub. L. 76–670
1940	Nationality Act of 1940	Pertains chiefly to "Nationality at Birth," Nationality through Naturalization," and "Loss of Nationality"	Pub. L. 76–853
1943	Chinese Exclusion Repeal Act of 1943 (Magnuson Act)	Repealed the Chinese Exclusion Act and permitted Chinese nationals already in the country to become naturalized citizens. A quota of 105 new Chinese immigrants were allowed into America per year.	Pub. L. 78–199
1944	Renunciation Act of 1944		Pub. L. 78–405
1945	War Brides Act	Exempted spouses and children of American service-members from immigration quota restrictions.	
1946	Alien Fiancées and Fiancés Act	Extended the War Brides Act to citizens of the Philippines and India.	Pub. L. 79–471
1946	Luce–Celler Act	Increased the quota from the Philippines and India to 100 immigrants annually. Permitted Filipino and Indian immigrants to be naturalized.	Pub. L. 79–483
1947		Extended the War Brides Act to Japan and Korea.	
1948	Displaced Persons Act	Granted permanent residence to displaced persons from Europe.	Pub. L. 80–774
1950	Lodge–Philbin Act		
1952	Immigration and Nationality Act (McCarran-Walter Act)	Set a quota for aliens with skills needed in the US.; Increased the power of the government to deport illegal immigrants suspected of Communist sympathies.	Pub. L. 82–414
1953	Refugee Relief Act		Pub. L. 83–203
1958	(No short title)	Facilitated permanent immigrant status for refugees from the Hungarian Revolution of 1956.	Pub. L. 85–559
1960	(No short title)	Authorized resettlement of certain refugees.	Pub. L. 86–648
1961	Immigration and Nationality Act Amendments of 1961		Pub. L. 87–301
1962	Migration and Refugee Assistance Act		Pub. L. 87–510
1965	Immigration and Nationality Act of 1965 (Hart-Celler Act)	Repealed the national-origin quotas.; Initiated a visa system for family reunification and skills.; Set a quota for Western Hemisphere immigration.; Set a 20k country limit for Eastern Hemisphere aliens.	Pub. L. 89–236
1966	Cuban Adjustment Act	Cuban nationals who enter, or were already present in the United States, legal status.	Pub. L. 89–732
1970	(No short title)		Pub. L. 91–225
1974	(No short title)	Increased funding for border enforcement facilities from $100,000 to $200,000.	Pub. L. 93–396
1974	(No short title)	Repealed 8 U.S.C. 331–339.	Pub. L. 93–461
1975	Indochina Migration and Refugee Assistance Act	Admitted refugees from South Vietnam, Laos, and Cambodia and funded relocation programs.	Pub. L. 94–23
1975	(No short title)	Granted certain immigrant children adopted by unmarried citizens the same immigration status as such children adopted by married citizens.	Pub. L. 94–155
1976	(No short title)	Set a quota of 170,000 annual immigrants from the Western Hemisphere and 120,000 annual immigrants from the Eastern Hemisphere.	Pub. L. 94–571
1978	(No short title)	Eliminated the hemispheric quota system for immigration. Established the Select Commission on Immigration and Refugee Policy.	Pub. L. 95–412
1978	(No short title)	Required approval by an adoption agency before an immigrant visa is issued for international adoption. Removed the cap on the number of alien children that can be adopted. Eased naturalization requirements for adopted children.	Pub. L. 95–417
1978	(No short title)	Banned the entry of any person that carried out persecution under the government of Nazi Germany.	Pub. L. 95–549
1980	Refugee Act	Created a policy for admitting refugees with the United Nations’ definition of refugees; Set an annual cap of 50,000 refugees.	Pub. L. 96–212
1980	(No short title)		Pub. L. 96–422
1981	Immigration and Nationality Act Amendments of 1981		Pub. L. 97–116
1982	Virgin Islands Nonimmigrant Alien Adjustment Act of 1981	Granted resident status to certain non-citizens that have resided in the Virgin Islands since 1975.	Pub. L. 97–271
1982	(No short title)	Gave priority to visas for residents of Korea, Vietnam, Laos, Cambodia, and Thailand that were fathered by American citizens.	Pub. L. 97–359
1982	Refugee Assistance Amendments of 1982		Pub. L. 97–363
1986	(No short title)	Authorized each state governor to select two residents of their state to be naturalized on Ellis Island.	Pub. L. 99–328
1986	(No short title)	Authorized crewmen of foreign fishing vessels to temporarily enter Guam as nonimmigrant aliens.	Pub. L. 99–505
1986	Immigration Reform and Control Act (Simpson–Mazzoli Act)	Started sanctions for knowingly hiring illegal immigrants.; Provided amnesty to some illegal immigrants already in the US.; Increased border enforcement.; Made it a crime to hire an illegal immigrant; Created a path to permanent residency for some illegal immigrant workers; Created the H-2A visa for seasonal agricultural workers	Pub. L. 99–603
1986	Refugee Assistance Extension Act of 1986		Pub. L. 99–605
1986	Immigration Marriage Fraud Amendments of 1986		Pub. L. 99–639
1986	Immigration and Nationality Act Amendments of 1986		Pub. L. 99–653
1988	American Homecoming Act	Prioritized immigration of Vietnamese children with American fathers.	
1988	Immigration Technical Corrections Act of 1988		Pub. L. 100–525
1988	Immigration Amendments of 1988	Authorized an additional 25,000 visas for immigrants from certain countries in FY1989 and FY1990.	Pub. L. 100–658
1989	Immigration Nursing Relief Act of 1989		Pub. L. 101–238
1990	Posthumous Citizenship for Active Duty Service Act of 1989	Authorized posthumous citizenship for noncitizen servicemembers of the United States Armed Forces killed in the line of duty.	Pub. L. 101–249
1990	Immigration Act of 1990	Increased legal immigration ceilings.; Created a diversity admissions category.	Pub. L. 101–649
1991	(No short title)	Extended special temporary protected status for Salvadorans.	Pub. L. 102–65
1991	1991 Armed Forces Immigration Adjustment Act	Granted special immigration status to immigrants that served in the United States Armed Forces for at least 12 years.	Pub. L. 102–110
1991	Miscellaneous and Technical Immigration and Naturalization Amendments of 1991		Pub. L. 102–232
1992	Chinese Student Protection Act of 1992	Codified Executive Order 12711 into law, establishing permanent residence for certain Chinese nationals.	Pub. L. 102–404
1992	Soviet Scientists Immigration Act of 1992	Authorized special admission of 750 scientists from the former Soviet Union.	Pub. L. 102–509
1993	(No short title)	Authorized funds for refugee assistance.	Pub. L. 103–37
1994	Immigration and Nationality Technical Corrections Act of 1994		Pub. L. 103–416
1995	(No short title)	Amended the Immigration and Nationality Act to redefine legitimate and illegitimate children.	Pub. L. 104–51 (text) (PDF)
1996	Omnibus Appropriations Act, 1997	Included a provision requiring an automated entry and exit control system for foreigners; Illegal Immigration Reform and Immigrant Responsibility Act of 1996; Phone verification for worker authentication by employers.; Access to welfare benefits more difficult for immigrants.; Increased border enforcement.; Reed Amendment attempted to deny visas to former U.S. citizens, but was never enforced	Pub. L. 104–208 (text) (PDF)
1996	(No short title)	Extended authorized stay for certain non-citizen nurses.	Pub. L. 104–302 (text) (PDF)
1997	(No short title)	Eliminated the certificate of citizenship transition rule applicable to certain children born outside the United States.	Pub. L. 105–38 (text) (PDF)
1997	Religious Workers Act of 1997	Extended the special migrant religious worker program through FY1999.	Pub. L. 105–54 (text) (PDF)
1997	District of Columbia Appropriations Act, 1998	Included the Nicaraguan Adjustment and Central American Relief Act, which provided benefits to immigrants from certain countries.	Pub. L. 105–100 (text) (PDF)
1997	(No short title)	Exempted internationally adopted children under age 10 from the immunization requirement.	Pub. L. 105–73 (text) (PDF)
1997	(No short title)	Funded refugee and entrant assistance.	Pub. L. 105–136 (text) (PDF)
1998	American Competitiveness and Workforce Improvement Act		
1998	Visa Waiver Pilot Program Reauthorization Act of 1997	Extended the visa waiver pilot program and extended it to nationals of countries with a visa refusal rate of less than 3%.	Pub. L. 105–173 (text) (PDF)
1998	(No short title)	Extended the deadline for the implementation of an automated entry and exit control system for non-citizens.	Pub. L. 105–259 (text) (PDF)
1998	Irish Peace Process Cultural and Training Program Act of 1998		Pub. L. 105–319 (text) (PDF)
1999	(No short title)	Extended the processing period for visa applicants suspended following the 1998 United States embassy bombings.	Pub. L. 105–360 (text) (PDF)
1999	Nursing Relief for Disadvantaged Areas Act of 1999		Pub. L. 406–95 (menu; GPO has not yet published law)
2000	American Competitiveness in the 21st Century Act		
2000	(No short title)		Pub. L. 106–104 (text) (PDF)
2000	(No short title)	Granted child status to non-citizens adopted under the age of 18 when adopted with a sibling under the age of 16.	Pub. L. 106–139 (text) (PDF)
2000	Hmong Veterans' Naturalization Act of 2000		Pub. L. 106–207 (text) (PDF)
2000	Immigration and Naturalization Service Data Management Improvement Act of 2000		Pub. L. 106–215 (text) (PDF)
2000	(No short title)	Increased filing fees for employers petitioning for H-1B visas.	Pub. L. 106–311 (text) (PDF)
2000	Kids 2000 Act		Pub. L. 106–313 (text) (PDF)
2000	(No short title)	Granted permanent resident status to 2,000 Syrian nationals.	Pub. L. 106–378 (text) (PDF)
2000	Victims of Trafficking and Violence Protection Act of 2000		Pub. L. 106–386 (text) (PDF)
2000	Child Citizenship Act of 2000		Pub. L. 106–395 (text) (PDF)
2000	Visa Waiver Permanent Program Act		Pub. L. 106–396 (text) (PDF)
2000	International Patient Act of 2000	Authorized visa extensions for individuals undergoing medical treatment.	Pub. L. 106–406 (text) (PDF)
2000	Religious Workers Act of 2000	Extended the special immigrant religious worker program of the Immigration and Nationality Act.	Pub. L. 106–409 (text) (PDF)
2000	(No short title)	Amended the Hmong Veterans' Naturalization Act to apply to certain spouses of deceased Hmong veterans.	Pub. L. 106–415 (text) (PDF)
2000	(No short title)	Granted exemptions for the oath of renunciation and allegiance for immigrants that are unable to understand or communicate an understanding of the oath.	Pub. L. 106–448 (text) (PDF)
2000	Bring Them Home Alive Act of 2000	Granted refugee status to nationals of certain Asian and European countries in exchange for the safe return of an American POW or MIA.	Pub. L. 106–484 (text) (PDF)
2000	(No short title)	Granted special immigrant status for 100 broadcasting employees annually.	Pub. L. 106–536 (text) (PDF)
2000	Legal Immigration Family Equity Act (LIFE Act)		Pub. L. 106–553 (text) (PDF)
2001	(No short title)	Indefinitely extended a provision regarding nonimmigrants with S visas that possess information regarding criminal activity.	Pub. L. 107–45 (text) (PDF)
2002	(No short title)	Authorized nonimmigrant spouses of E visa recipients to work in the United States.	Pub. L. 107–124 (text) (PDF)
2002	(No short title)	Authorized nonimmigrant spouses of L visa recipients to work in the United States. Reduced the required duration of employment to apply for L visas from one year to six months.	Pub. L. 107–125 (text) (PDF)
2002	Basic Pilot Extension Act of 2001	Extended pilot programs of the Illegal Immigration Reform and Immigrant Responsibility Act.	Pub. L. 107–128 (text) (PDF)
2002	Family Sponsor Immigration Act of 2002		Pub. L. 107–150 (text) (PDF)
2002	Enhanced Border Security and Visa Entry Reform Act of 2002	Provided for more Border Patrol agents.; Requires that schools report foreign students attending classes.; Stipulates that foreign nationals in the US will be required to carry IDs with biometric technology.	Pub. L. 107–173 (text) (PDF)
2002	(No short title)		Pub. L. 107–185 (text) (PDF)
2002	Child Status Protection Act		Pub. L. 107–208 (text) (PDF)
2002	(No short title)	Extended the Irish Peace Process Cultural and Training Program Act through FY2006.	Pub. L. 107–234 (text) (PDF)
2002	Persian Gulf War POW/MIA Accountability Act of 2002	Granted refugee status to nationals of Middle Eastern countries in exchange for the safe return of an American POW or MIA.	Pub. L. 107–258 (text) (PDF)
2002	Border Commuter Student Act of 2002	Created a special classification for Canadian and Mexican nationals that commute to the United States for study.	Pub. L. 107–274 (text) (PDF)
2002	Homeland Security Act of 2002	Moved all transportation, customs, immigration, and border security agencies to operate under the Department of Homeland Security.; Requires agencies to share information and coordinate efforts in relation to national security and border control.; Stipulates which agencies are responsible for which duties in relation to immigration and border security.; Outlines specific requirements on handling of children in immigration and border issues.	Pub. L. 107–296 (text) (PDF)
2003	(No short title)	Extended the special immigrant religious worker program through FY2008.	Pub. L. 108–99 (text) (PDF)
2003	Basic Pilot Program Extension and Expansion Act of 2003	Extended pilot programs of the Illegal Immigration Reform and Immigrant Responsibility Act.	Pub. L. 108–156 (text) (PDF)
2004	(No short title)	Extended the requirement of installation of equipment to process documents with biometric identifiers in all ports of entry by one year.	Pub. L. 108–299 (text) (PDF)
2004	(No short title)		Pub. L. 108–441 (text) (PDF)
2004	Consolidated Appropriations Act, 2005	Included the H-1B Visa Reform Act of 2004.	Pub. L. 108–447 (text) (PDF)
2004	(No short title)		Pub. L. 108–449 (text) (PDF)
2005	REAL ID Act	Required use of IDs meeting certain security standards to enter government buildings, board planes, open bank accounts.; Created more restrictions on political asylum; Severely curtailed habeas corpus relief for immigrants; Increased immigration enforcement mechanisms; Altered judicial review; Established national standards for state driver licenses.; Cleared the way for the building of border barriers.	Pub. L. 109–13 (text) (PDF)
2005	International Marriage Broker Regulation Act		Pub. L. 109–162 (text) (PDF)
2006	Secure Fence Act of 2006	Authorized the construction of fencing along the Mexico–United States border.	Pub. L. 109–367 (text) (PDF)
2006	Nursing Relief for Disadvantaged Areas Reauthorization Act of 2005	Reauthorized the H-1C visa program through 2009.	Pub. L. 109–423 (text) (PDF)
2006	COMPETE Act of 2006	Expanded the definition of athletes and entertainers for P-1 visas.	Pub. L. 109–463 (text) (PDF)
2007	Physicians for Underserved Areas Act	Extended the J-1 visa program through June 1, 2008.	Pub. L. 109–477 (text) (PDF)
2007	(No short title)	Admitted an additional 500 immigration applicants for Iraqi and Afghan translators working with the United States.	Pub. L. 110–36 (text) (PDF)
2008	(No short title)	Made minor adjustments to special immigrant status for Iraqis employed by the United States.	Pub. L. 110–242 (text) (PDF)
2008	Kendell Frederick Citizenship Assistance Act	Simplified the fingerprinting process during naturalization.	Pub. L. 110–251 (text) (PDF)
2008	(No short title)	Extended the J-1 visa waiver program through March 2009 and increased the number of foreign physicians from five to ten in state facilities.	Pub. L. 110–362 (text) (PDF)
2008	Military Personnel Citizenship Processing Act	Established the Office of the FBI Liaison in the DHS to support expedited processing of naturalization applications for members of the Armed Forces and their families.	Pub. L. 110–382 (text) (PDF)
2008	Special Immigrant Nonminister Religious Worker Program Act	Extended the special immigrant program through March 2009.	Pub. L. 110–391 (text) (PDF)
2009	(No short title)	Extended the special immigrant program and the J-1 visa waiver program through FY2009.	Pub. L. 111–9 (text) (PDF)
2010	International Adoption Simplification Act		Pub. L. 111–220 (text) (PDF)
2010	(No short title)	Appropriated emergency funds for border security.	Pub. L. 111–230 (text) (PDF)
2010	Help HAITI Act of 2010	Granted permanent resident status to 1,400 Haitian orphans that were adopted in the United States.	Pub. L. 111–293 (text) (PDF)
2011	Asia-Pacific Economic Cooperation Business Travel Cards Act of 2011		Pub. L. 112–54 (text) (PDF)
2011	(No short title)	Tolled the periods of time to file a petition and appear for an interview to remove the conditional basis for permanent resident status during active-duty service.	Pub. L. 112–58 (text) (PDF)
2012	(No short title)	Extended several immigration programs by three years.	Pub. L. 112–176 (text) (PDF)
2012	(No short title)	Created a reciprocal non-immigrant investor program with Israel.	Pub. L. 112–130 (text) (PDF)
2012	Jaime Zapata Border Enforcement Security Task Force Act	Created the Border Enforcement Security Task Force within the Department of Homeland Security.	Pub. L. 112–205 (text) (PDF)
2012	(No short title)	Recognized employment of contract with the American military as contributing toward the residency requirement for naturalization.	Pub. L. 112–227 (text) (PDF)
2013	(No short title)	Extended authorization for Iraqi citizens to be granted special immigrant status for service during the Iraq War.	Pub. L. 113–42 (text) (PDF)
2014	Accuracy for Adoptees Act		Pub. L. 113–74 (text) (PDF)
2014	Emergency Afghan Allies Extension Act of 2014	Authorized special immigrant visas for Afghan citizens that supported the United States in the war in Afghanistan.	Pub. L. 113–160 (text) (PDF)
2015	Adoptive Family Relief Act		Pub. L. 114–70 (text) (PDF)
2017	Asia-Pacific Economic Cooperation Business Travel Cards Act of 2017		Pub. L. 115–79 (text) (PDF)
2015	Knowledgeable Innovators and Worthy Investors Act (KIWI Act)	Created a reciprocal non-immigrant investor program with New Zealand.	Pub. L. 115–226 (text) (PDF)
2019	Northern Mariana Islands Long-Term Legal Residents Relief Act	Granted resident status to certain non-citizens that have resided in the Northern Mariana Islands since 2009.	Pub. L. 116–24 (text) (PDF)
2019	Emergency Supplemental Appropriations for Humanitarian Assistance and Security at the Southern Border Act, 2019	Provided emergency spending on border security for FY2019.	Pub. L. 116–26 (text) (PDF)
2020	Citizenship for Children of Military Members and Civil Servants Act	Guaranteed that the children of U.S. citizens working abroad for the government in civilian or military service are granted citizenship.	Pub. L. 116–133 (text) (PDF)
2021	Securing America's Ports Act		Pub. L. 116–299 (text) (PDF)
2022	Shadow Wolves Enhancement Act	Recognized the Shadow Wolves as ICE special agents.	Pub. L. 117–113 (text) (PDF)
2025	Laken Riley Act	Mandated the detention of foreigners admitting to, charged with, or convicted of certain criminal offenses.	Pub. L. 119–1 (text) (PDF)

== Executive actions ==
Year	Title	Description
1954	Operation Wetback	Immigration and Naturalization Service roundup and deportation of illegal immigrants in selected areas of California, Arizona, and Texas along the border.
1990	Executive Order 12711	Deferred deportation of Chinese nationals in response to the 1989 Tiananmen Square protests and massacre. Later codified into law under the Chinese Student Protection Act.
2012	Deferred Action for Childhood Arrivals	On June 15, 2012, the secretary of homeland security announced that certain people who came to the United States as children and meet several guidelines may request consideration of deferred action for a period of two years, subject to renewal. They are also eligible for work authorization. Deferred action is a use of prosecutorial discretion to defer removal action against an individual for a certain period of time. Deferred action does not provide lawful status.

== See also ==
- History of immigration to the United States
- History of laws concerning immigration and naturalization in the United States
- Illegal immigration to the United States
- Immigration policy of the United States
- Immigration to the United States
- List of United States federal legislation
- United States nationality law
