= Passport Act of 1782 =

American law

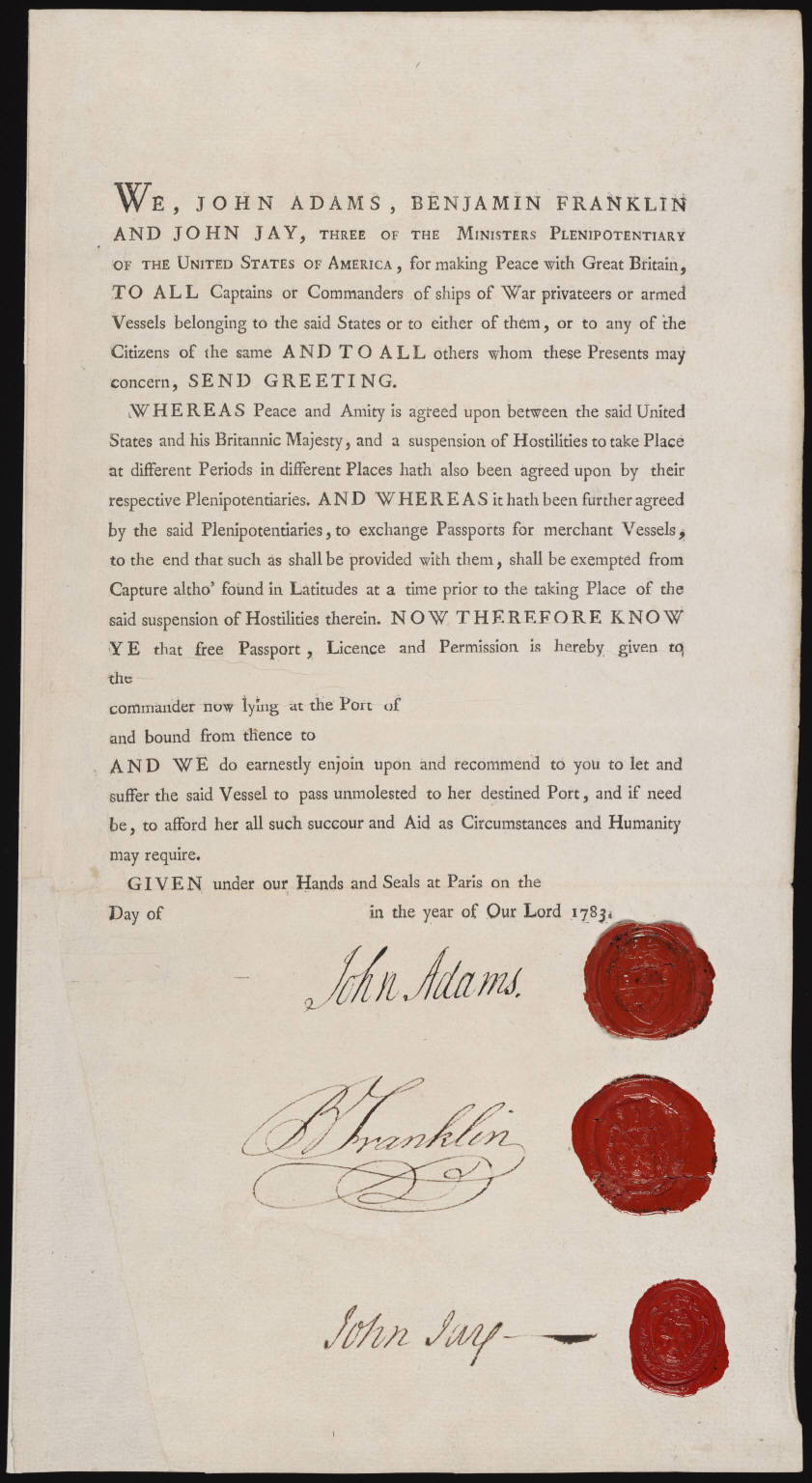
Ministers plenipotentiary passport for the United States to deliberate amity and peace with Great Britain while signing the Treaty of Paris

Passport Act of 1782 was enacted by the Congress of the Confederation on February 11, 1782. The Act was recorded in the twenty-second volume of the Journals of the Continental Congress. The passport article was a letter from Thomas Smith of Virginia to George Clymer, Samuel Osgood, and James Madison regarding the nautical trade between tobacco colonies. The Act of Congress states safe passage for the Commonwealth of Virginia traders capitulants seeking to transport tobacco from Yorktown, Virginia to New York.

== Passport Act, 1782 ==
Resolved, That the secretary of Congress be, and hereby is empowered to grant letters of passport and safe conduct for the exportation of such tobacco to New York, on the conditions and under the limitations which shall, to the said Secretary and to the Superintendant of the finances of the United States, appear most proper and beneficial to the said states, being consistent with the said capitulation: provided always, that permission be not given for the exporting of tobacco, beyond the amount of the produce of the sales of the said goods belonging to the capitulants abovementioned.

- Congress of the Confederation ~ Journals of the Continental Congress, Volume 22 (Monday, February 11, 1782)

== Tobacco Cargo Passport, 1783 ==
The committee, consisting of Mr. Thomas Fitzsimmons, Mr. Oliver Ellsworth, Mr. John Lewis Gervais, Mr. Nathaniel Gorham and Mr. Alexander Hamilton, to whom were referred resolutions of the general assembly of the Commonwealth of Virginia, dated 28 December, 1782, respecting the shipment of a quantity of tobacco, under passports granted by the secretary of Congress;

- Congress of the Confederation ~ Journals of the Continental Congress, Volume 24 (Monday, February 10, 1783)

== United States laws governing passports ==
United States federal statutes establishing authorities, powers, and rulings with regards to passports and sea letters awarded within the United States.

U.S. statutes related to passports

Date of Enactment	Public Law No.	U.S. Statute Citation	U.S. Bill No.	U.S. Presidential Administration
December 31, 1792	P.L. 2-1	1 Stat. 287	Chapter 1	George Washington
June 1, 1796	P.L. 4-45	1 Stat. 489	Chapter 45	George Washington
April 14, 1802	P.L. 7-26	2 Stat. 153	Chapter 26	Thomas Jefferson
February 28, 1803	P.L. 7-9	2 Stat. 203	Chapter 9	Thomas Jefferson
March 2, 1803	P.L. 7-16	2 Stat. 208	Chapter 16	Thomas Jefferson
March 2, 1803	P.L. 7-18	2 Stat. 209	Chapter 18	Thomas Jefferson
March 26, 1810	P.L. 11-19	2 Stat. 568a	Chapter 19	James Madison
February 12, 1831	P.L. 21-20	4 Stat. 441	Chapter 20	Andrew Jackson
August 18, 1856	P.L. 34-127	11 Stat. 52	Chapter 127	Franklin Pierce
March 3, 1863	P.L. 37-79	12 Stat. 744	Chapter 79	Abraham Lincoln
May 30, 1866	P.L. 39-102	14 Stat. 54	Chapter 102	Andrew Johnson
February 8, 1870	Pub.Res. 41-8	16 Stat. 368	Resolution 8	Ulysses Grant
April 30, 1878	P.L. 45-74	20 Stat. 40	Chapter 74	Rutherford Hayes
June 14, 1902	P.L. 57-158	32 Stat. 386	Chapter 1088	William McKinley
March 2, 1907	P.L. 59-193	34 Stat. 1228	H.R. 24122	Theodore Roosevelt
March 4, 1909	Pub.Res. 60-60	35 Stat. 1170	H.J.Res. 235	Theodore Roosevelt
June 15, 1917	P.L. 65-24	40 Stat. 217	H.R. 291	Woodrow Wilson
May 22, 1918	P.L. 65–154	40 Stat. 559	H.R. 10264	Woodrow Wilson
November 10, 1919	P.L. 66-79	41 Stat. 353	H.R. 9782	Woodrow Wilson
June 4, 1920	P.L. 66-238	41 Stat. 739	H.R. 11960	Woodrow Wilson
July 3, 1926	P.L. 69-493	44 Stat. 887	H.R. 12495	Calvin Coolidge
June 20, 1941	P.L. 77-113	55 Stat. 252	S. 913	Franklin Roosevelt
July 26, 1968	P.L. 90-428	82 Stat. 446	S. 1418	Lyndon Johnson
September 17, 1974	P.L. 93-417	88 Stat. 1151	H.R. 15172	Gerald Ford
January 10, 2006	P.L. 109-167	119 Stat. 3578	H.R. 4501	George W. Bush

== 1776-1799 treaties of trade with Old World ==
In June 1775, John Adams and George Wythe orchestrated the eminent attributes for international accord known as a Model Treaty.

Colonial America consented to terms with European dominions for respective commerce, maritime trade, and navigation regulations upon the conclusion of the American Revolution. During the cessation of the 18th century, mediterranean basin treaties were settled upon by the North African Barbary Coast and the Iberian Peninsula foreign states.

The multinational protocol documents or treaties endorse the use of passports and sea-letters for state sovereignty identification of merchant ships navigating the seven seas. The safe-conduct permits were allocated in the event of a declaration of war between nations while sequestering manners of dissension and quarrels. The travel dockets governed the full-rigged ship name, bulk and cargo aboard sailing ship, and the identity of commanders or shipmasters including their place of habitation.

1776 Model Treaty

Date of Ratification	Artisan	Treaty with Colonial America	Sovereign State	Source	Journal Pages
July 18, 1776	Confederation Congress	Plan of Treaties (original draft)	Foreign Nations	Continental Congress Journals, 1774-1789	576-589
September 17, 1776	Confederation Congress	Plan of Treaties	Foreign Nations	Continental Congress Journals, 1774-1789	768-779

1778 Treaty of Alliance

Date of Ratification	Artisan	Treaty with Colonial America	Sovereign State	Source	Journal Pages
February 6, 1778	Confederation Congress	Treaty of Alliance	Foreign Nations (France)	Continental Congress Journals, 1774-1789	6-11

1778-1794 European commerce and trade Treaties

Date of Ratification	Artisan	Treaty with Colonial America	Sovereign State	Source	Journal Pages
February 6, 1778	Confederation Congress	Amity and Commerce	France	Continental Congress Journals, 1774-1789	12-30
October 8, 1782	Confederation Congress	Amity and Commerce	United Netherlands	Continental Congress Journals, 1774-1789	32-50
April 3, 1783	Confederation Congress	Amity and Commerce	Sweden	Continental Congress Journals, 1774-1789	60-79
1785	Confederation Congress	Amity and Commerce	Prussia	Continental Congress Journals, 1774-1789	84-99
November 19, 1794	Confederation Congress	Amity, Commerce, and Navigation	Great Britain	Continental Congress Journals, 1774-1789	116-132

1791-1799 Mediterranean amity and peace treaties

Date of Ratification	Artisan	Treaty with Colonial America	Sovereign State	Source	Journal Pages
March 3, 1791	Confederation Congress	Peace and Friendship	Morocco	Continental Congress Journals, 1774-1789	100-105
September 5, 1795	Confederation Congress	Peace and Amity	Algeria	Continental Congress Journals, 1774-1789	133-137
October 27, 1795	Confederation Congress	Friendship, Limits, and Navigation	Spain	Continental Congress Journals, 1774-1789	138-153
November 4, 1796	Confederation Congress	Peace and Friendship	Libya	Continental Congress Journals, 1774-1789	154-156
1797-1799	Confederation Congress	Peace and Friendship	Tunisia	Continental Congress Journals, 1774-1789	157-161

== See also ==
Arnold Cipher	Impressment
British America	Jay Treaty
Carriage of Passengers Act of 1855	Passenger Act of 1882
Cocket	Passport Act of 1926
Crimes Act of 1790	Stamp seal
Foreign Ship Registry Act	Steerage Act of 1819
HM Customs	Wartime Measure Act of 1918

Articles of Foreign Transit

Bill of lading	Ship's articles
Letter of marque	United Nations laissez-passer
Mediterranean pass	United States passport

Maritime Navigation and trade

Age of Sail	Nautical almanac
Bowditch's American Practical Navigator	Shipbuilding in the American colonies
British timber trade	Smuggling
Celestial navigation	Transatlantic crossing
Jack Tar	Winds in the Age of Sail

Origins of Passport

Biblical Old Testament Canon	England in Late Middle Ages	Safe Passage in Medieval England
Artaxerxes I of Persia	Henry V of England	British passport
Nehemiah 2	St Crispin's Day Speech	Safe Conducts Act 1414

== Gallery ==
United States Passport Forms
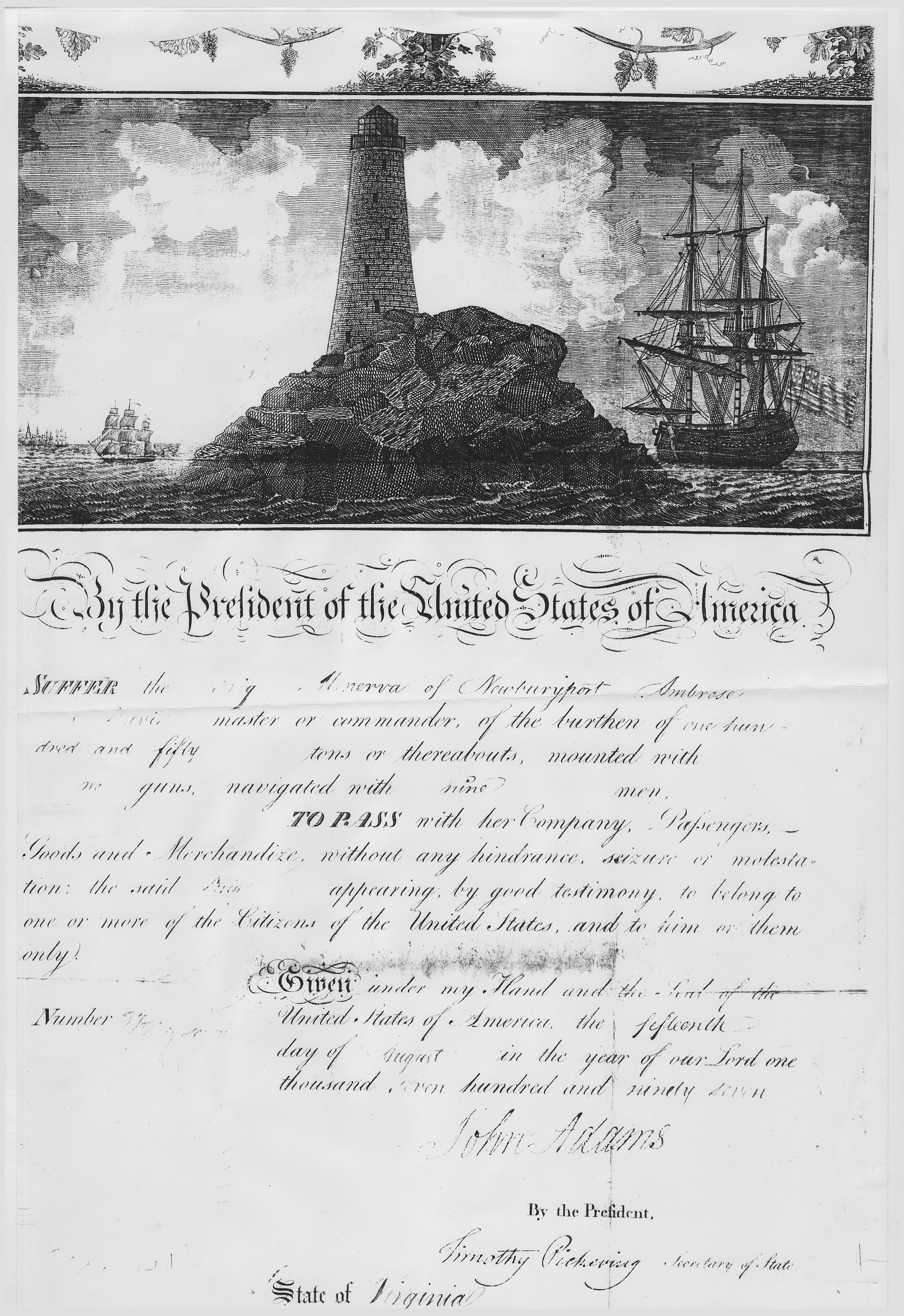
Passport allowing passage of ship signed by President John Adams. Passport for Ambrose Davis, Captain of Brig Minerva of Newburyport, Massachusetts, August 15, 1797

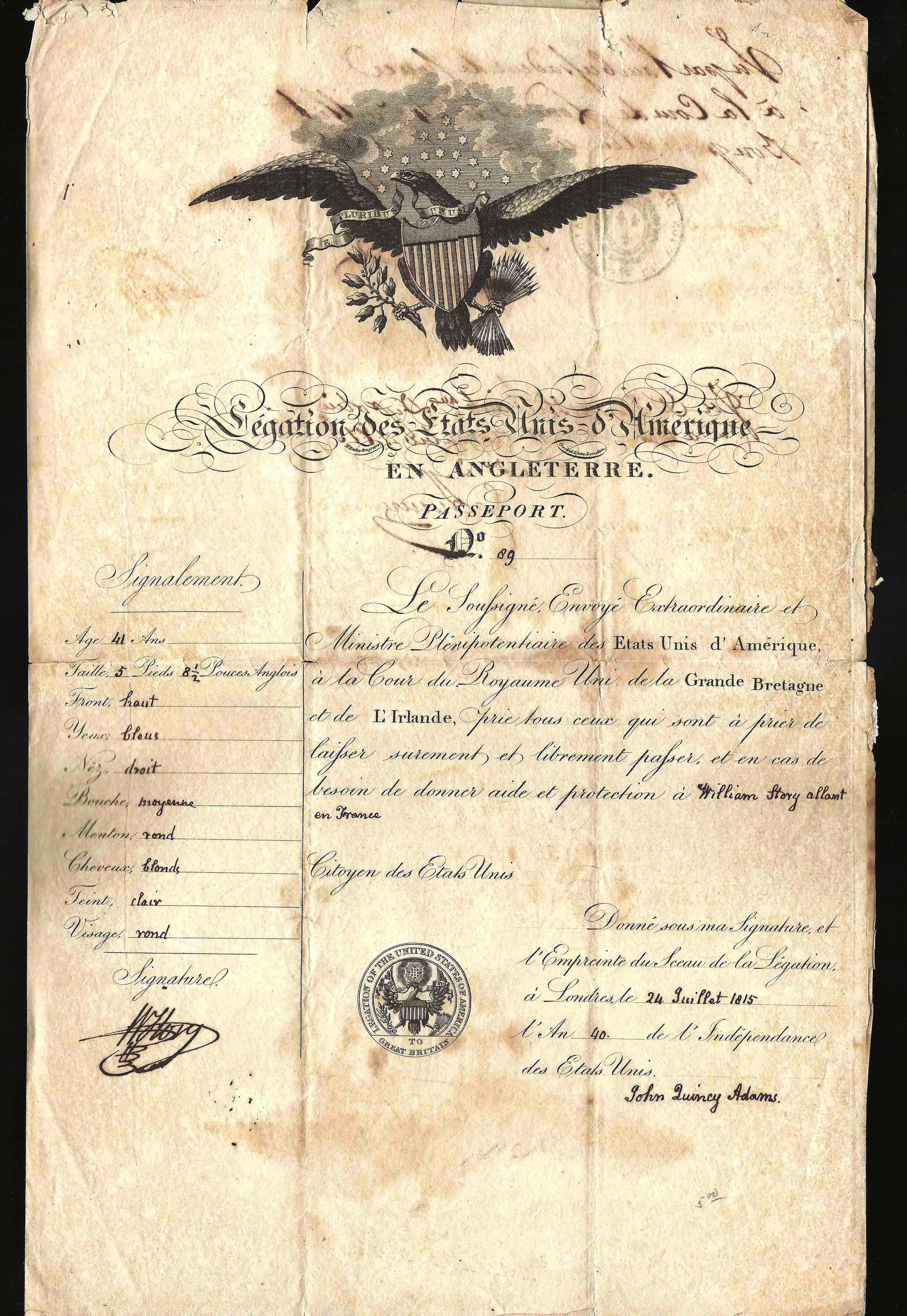
U.S. passport awarded by John Quincy Adams in London on July 24, 1815 for William Story to enter France

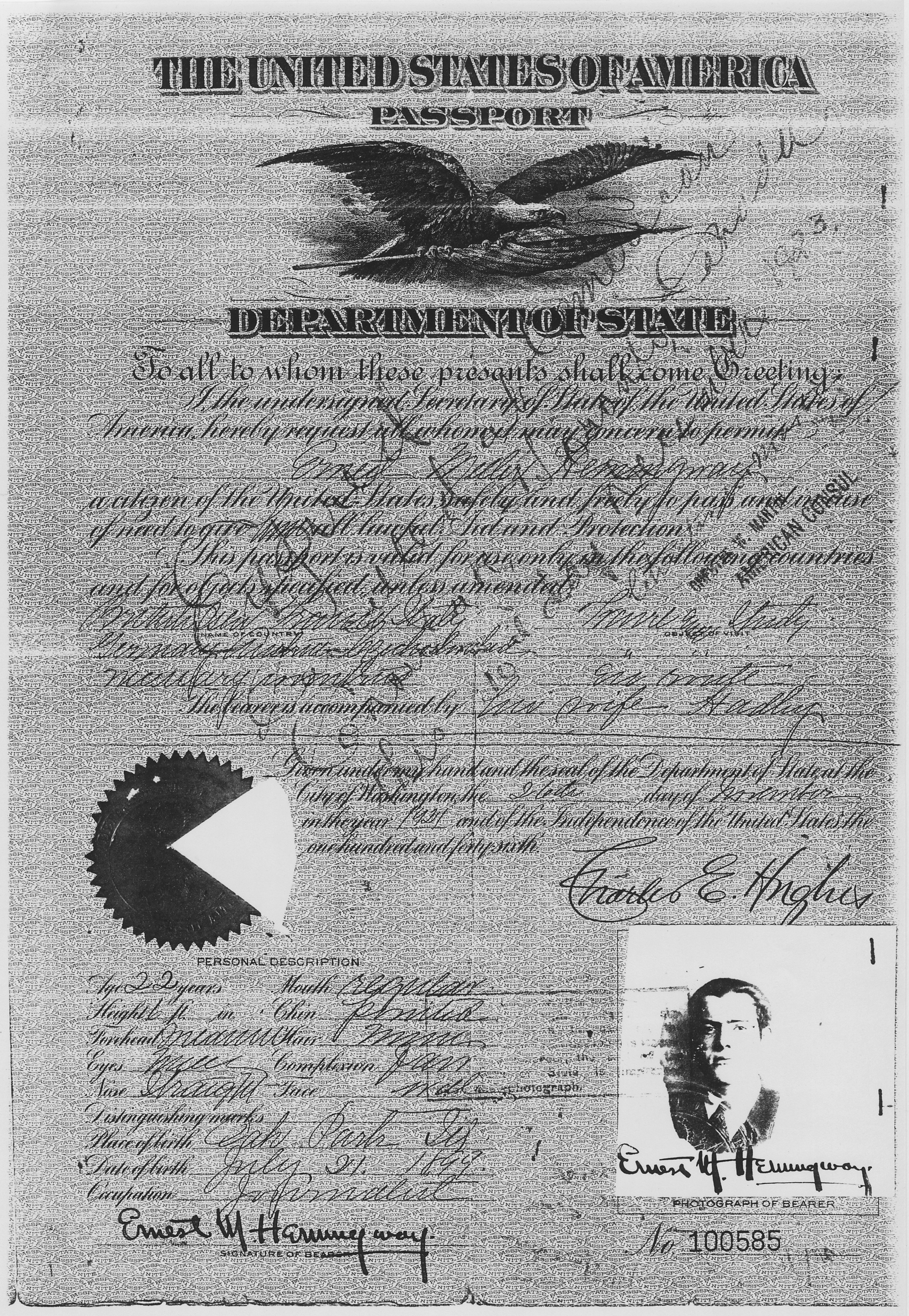
U.S. passport awarded to Ernest Hemingway (circa 1921)

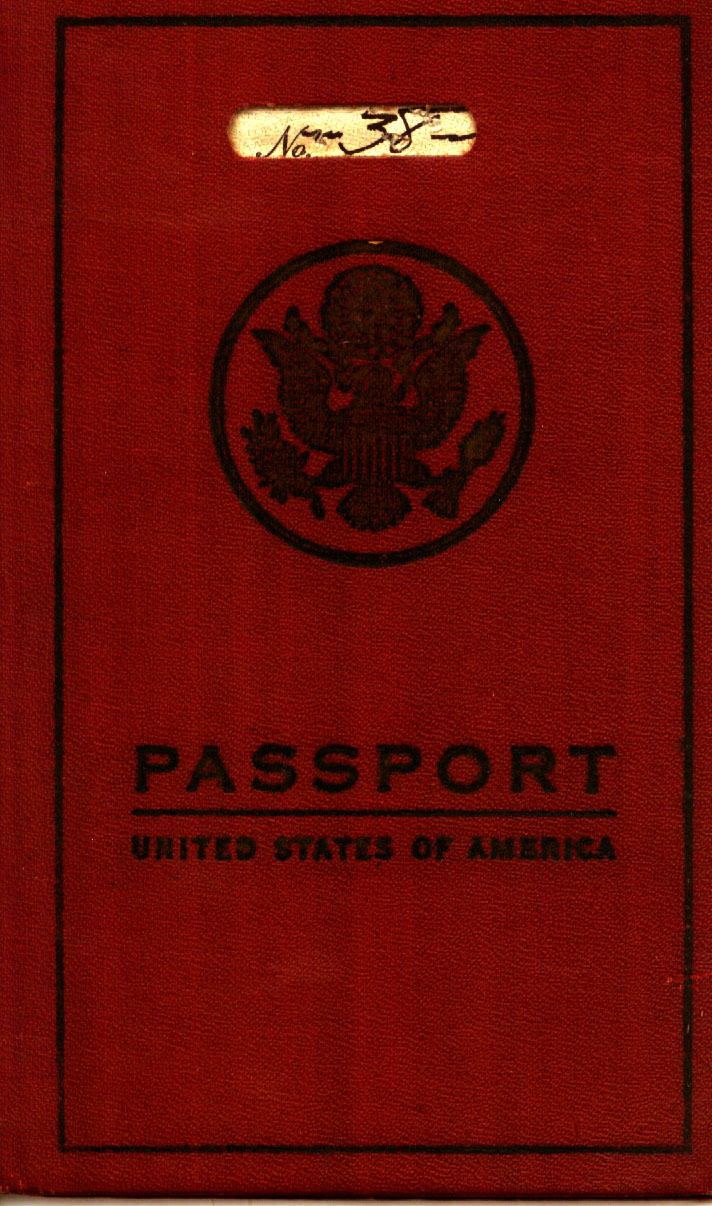
Cover of a United States passport (circa 1927)

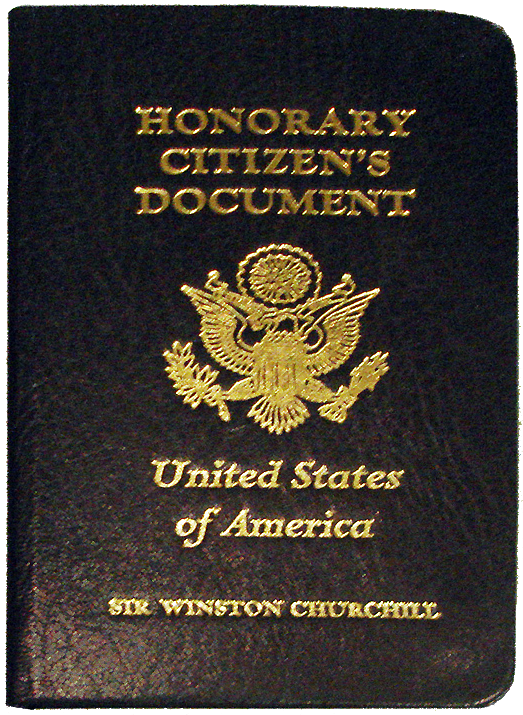
U.S. passport awarded by John F. Kennedy to Winston Churchill (circa 1963)

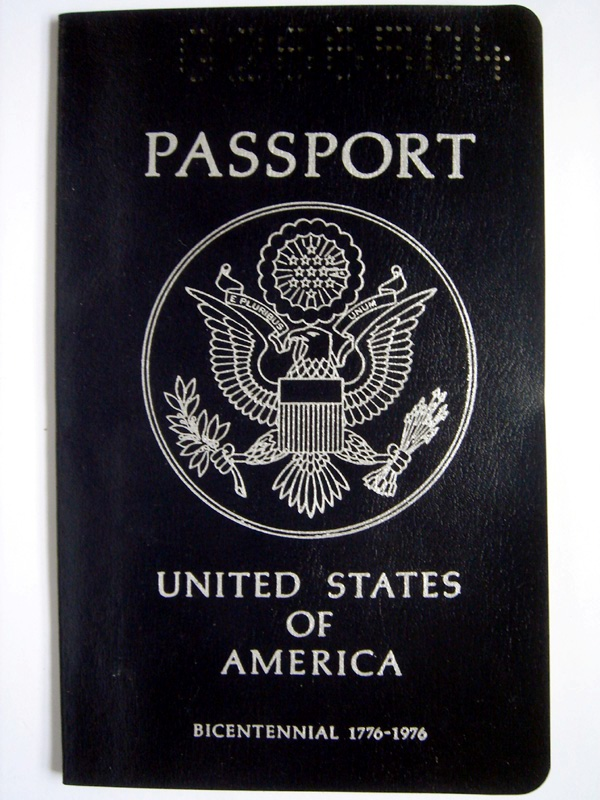
Cover of a United States passport (circa 1976)

== Journals of the Continental Congress, 1774-1789 ==
- Richard Montgomery, Continental Army (November 12, 1775). "Articles of Capitulation ~ Citizens and Inhabitants of Montreal". Journals of the Continental Congress, 1774-1789. United States Library of Congress. LCCN 90898002.
- Confederation Congress (May 2, 1780). "Instructions to the Captains and Commanders of Private Armed Vessels". Journals of the Continental Congress, 1774-1789. United States Library of Congress. LCCN 90898062.
- Confederation Congress (March 27, 1781). "An Ordinance - Capture and Condemnation of Prizes". Journals of the Continental Congress, 1774-1789. United States Library of Congress. LCCN 90898065.
- Confederation Congress (April 7, 1781). "Instructions be Observed by the Captains or Commanders of Private Armed Vessels". Journals of the Continental Congress, 1774-1789. United States Library of Congress. LCCN 90898104.
- Confederation Congress (December 4, 1781). "An Ordinance - Captures On Water Shall Be Lawful". Journals of the Continental Congress, 1774-1789. United States Library of Congress. LCCN 90898114.
- Confederation Congress (February 12, 1788). "Minister Plenipotentiary Sea Letters for Courts of London and the Hague". Journals of the Continental Congress, 1774-1789. 34 (Tuesday, February 12, 1788). United States Library of Congress: 39–41.

== Articles of 18th century ==
- John Adams (June 18, 1776). "I. A Plan of Treaties, 18 June 1776" [original draft]. Founders Online. U.S. National Archives and Records Administration.
- John Adams (August 27, 1776). "II. Committee Report on A Plan of Treaties, 27 August 1776". Founders Online. U.S. National Archives and Records Administration.
- John Adams (September 17, 1776). "III. Plan of Treaties as Adopted (with Instructions), 17 September 1776". Founders Online. U.S. National Archives and Records Administration.
- John Adams (September 17, 1776). "The Model Treaty, 1776". Office of the Historian. Washington, D.C.: United States Department of State.
- Benjamin Franklin (March 10, 1779). "To All Captains and Commanders of American Armed Ships". Founders Online. U.S. National Archives and Records Administration.
- "Signed Passport by Benedict Arnold". Manhattan, New York: Doyle New York. April 19, 1779.
- Fourth United States Congress (June 1, 1796). "Ships and Vessels Passports Act of 1796 - P.L. 4-45". United States Library of Congress. U.S. Statutes at Large, 1 Stat. 489, Chapter XLV. Philadelphia, Pennsylvania: Francis Childs. LCCN 2020767670.

== Bibliography ==
- Goldfarb, Phil (2014). A Page of History: Passport Applications 1851-1914. Tate Publishing & Enterprises LLC. ISBN 978-1632682376. OCLC 880966971.
- Robertson, Craig (2010). The Passport in America: The History of a Document. Oxford University Press. ISBN 978-0199779895. OCLC 768548553.
- Lloyd, Martin (2003). The Passport: The History of Man's Most Travelled Document. Stroud, Gloucestershire: Sutton Publishing. ISBN 978-0750929646. OCLC 59329531.
- Salter, Mark B. (2003). Rights of Passage: The Passport in International Relations. Lynne Rienner Publishers. ISBN 978-1588261458. OCLC 51518371.
- Torpey, John (2000). The Invention of the Passport: Surveillance, Citizenship and the State. Cambridge University Press. ISBN 978-0521634939. OCLC 41387626.
- Potter, Dorothy Williams (1990). Passports of Southeastern Pioneers, 1770-1823: Indian, Spanish and Other Land Passports for Tennessee, Kentucky, Georgia, Mississippi, Virginia, North and South Carolina. Genealogical Publishing Company. ISBN 978-0806312729. OCLC 21376809.
- United States Department of State (1898). "The American Passport: Its History and a Digest of Laws, Rulings and Regulations Governing Its Issuance by the Department of State". U.S. Government Printing Office. OCLC 3836079. Archived from the original on March 9, 2008.
