= Passenger Act of 1882 =

- Other short titles: Boarding of Vessels Act, 1882; Carriage of Passengers Act, 1882
- Long title: An Act to regulate the carriage of passengers by sea.
- Nicknames: Passenger Act, 1882
- Enacted by: the 47th United States Congress
- Effective: October 31, 1882

Citations
- Public law: Pub. L. 47–374
- Statutes at Large: 22 Stat. 186, Chap. 374

Codification
- Titles amended: 46 U.S.C.: Shipping
- U.S.C. sections created: 46 U.S.C. ch. 601 § 60101

Legislative history
- Introduced in the House as H.R. 6722; Passed the House on (Passed); Passed the Senate on July 29, 1882 (25-17); Signed into law by President Chester A. Arthur on August 2, 1882

The Passenger Act of 1882 is a United States federal statute establishing occupancy control regulations for seafaring passenger ships completing Atlantic and Pacific transoceanic crossings to America during the late 19th century and early 20th century. The Act of Congress sanctioned vessel compartment dimensions in cubic feet comparable to the level within a ship's deck. The public law authorized the numerical serialization of berths which were subject to compartment occupancy inspections of emigrants and ocean liner passengers. The Law of the United States accentuated and endorsed a regulatory clause stating no person, on arrival of a vessel in a port, will be allowed to go aboard a passenger ship necessitating a bow to stern inspection.

The Immigration Act of 1882 was simultaneously presented during the 47th United States congressional session which was enacted into law on August 3, 1882. The H.R. 6722 bill was passed by the 47th congressional session and enacted into law by the 21st President of the United States Chester Arthur on August 2, 1882.

== Provisions of the Act ==
The United States federal law was penned as fourteen sections emphasizing essentials for safe passage during an oceanic voyage associated with an American port.

=== Summary of United States statute protocols ===
- Accountability of seafaring passengers occupancy
- Hygiene requirements
- Identity verification of emigrants
- Passenger quarters' allocations by numerical designation
- Prohibited materials determined as dangerous goods for transportation of seas
- Public health awareness by imposed social distancing
- Sick bay provision with medical apparatuses
- Violation of act penalties

Carriage of Passengers by Sea – 22 Stat. 186 § 1

Emigrants and passengers, other than cabin passengers, from foreign ports to be provided compartments
Sailing vessel restrictions and requirements
Space per passenger
Computation of children boarded on vessel
Violation of Act penalties

Ships Deck Capacity Illustrations

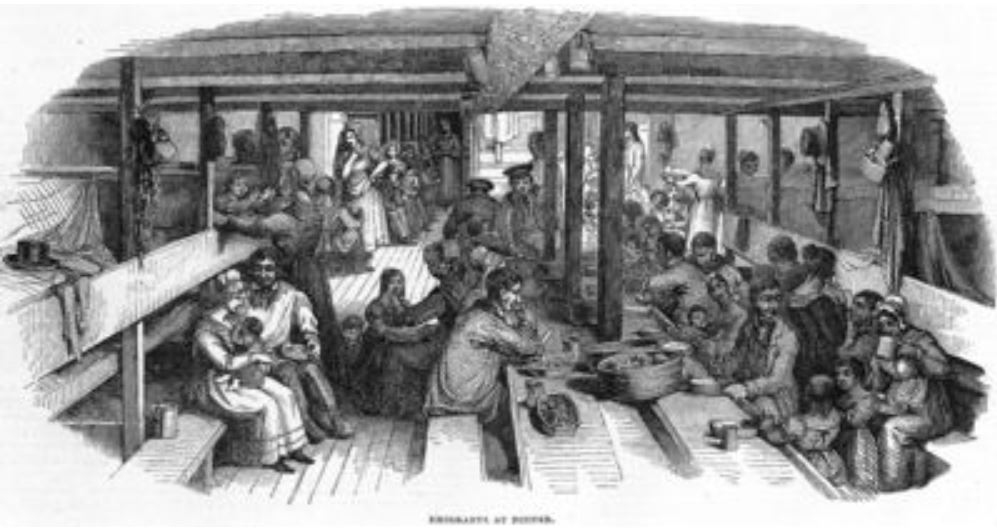
St. Vincent lower deck in 1844

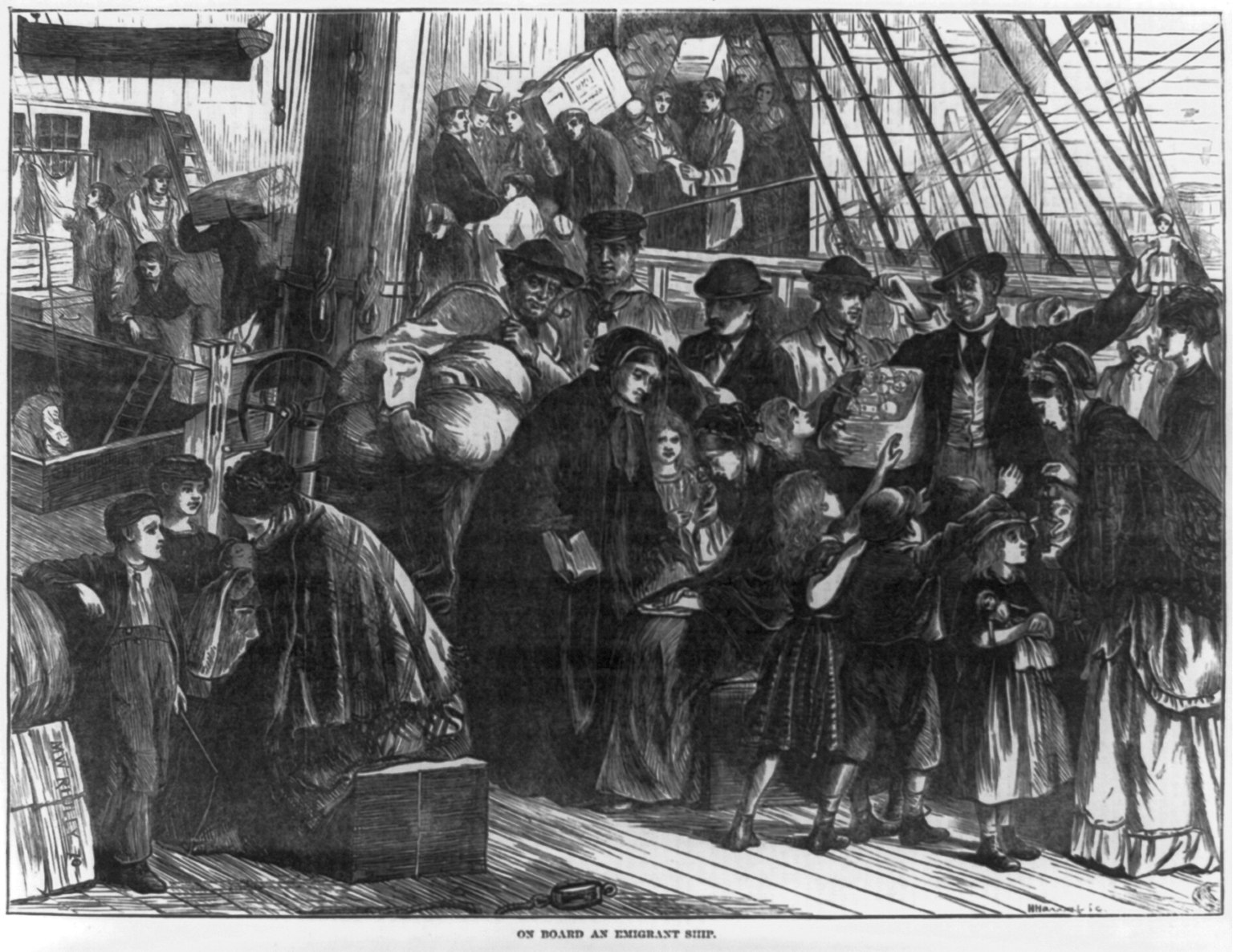
Passengers on Emigrant Ship

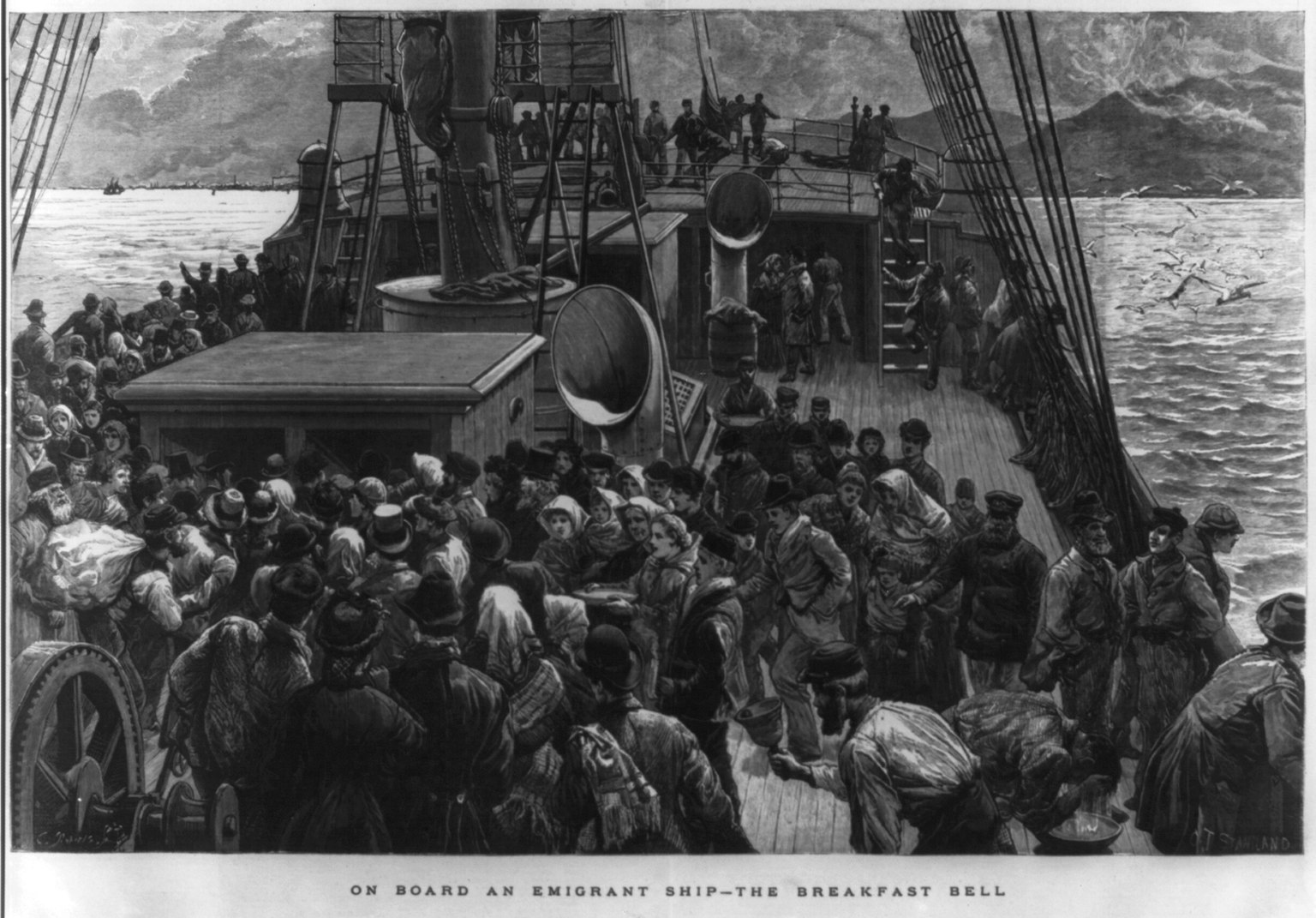
Breakfast on Emigrant Ship

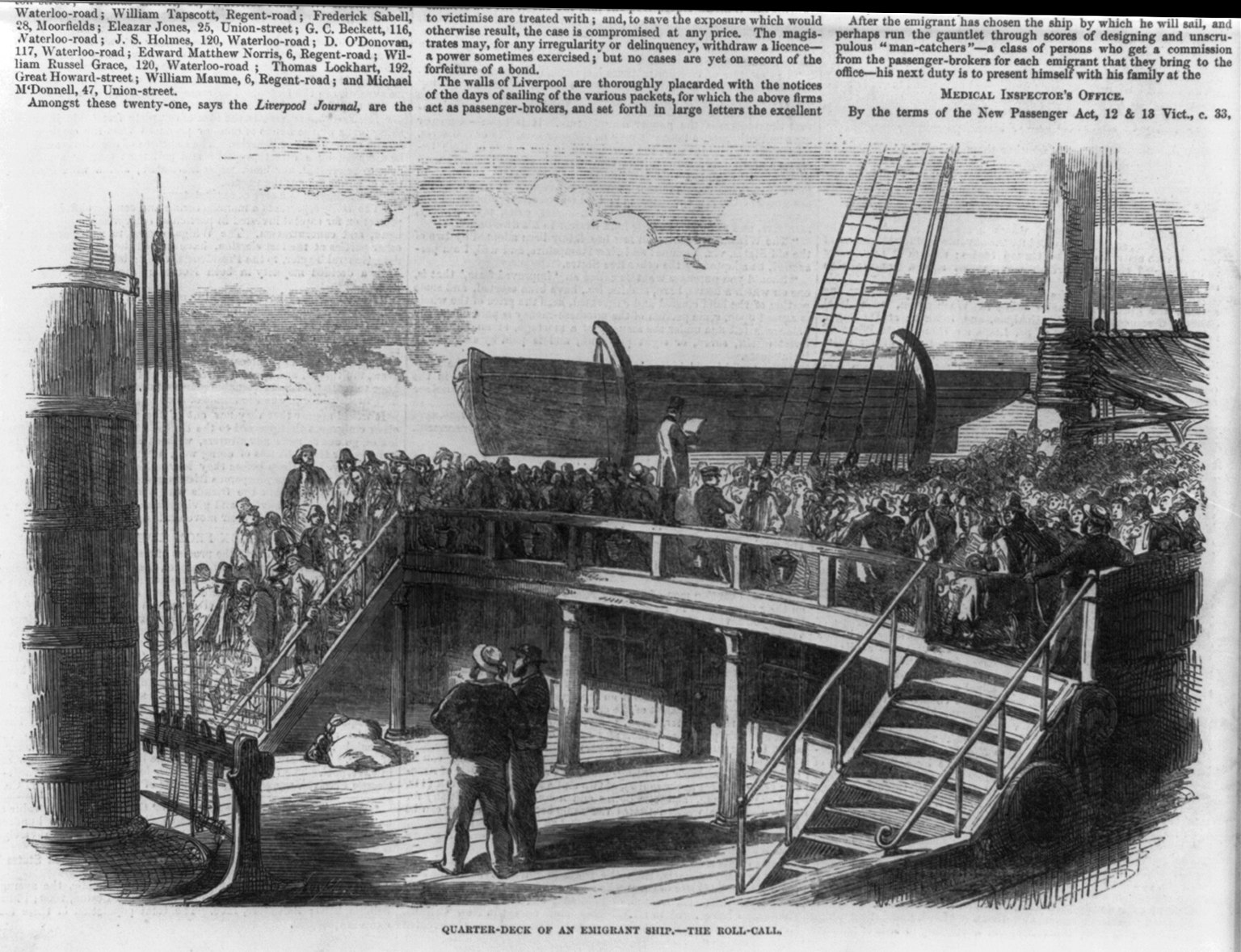
Passenger Roll Call on ship quarterdeck

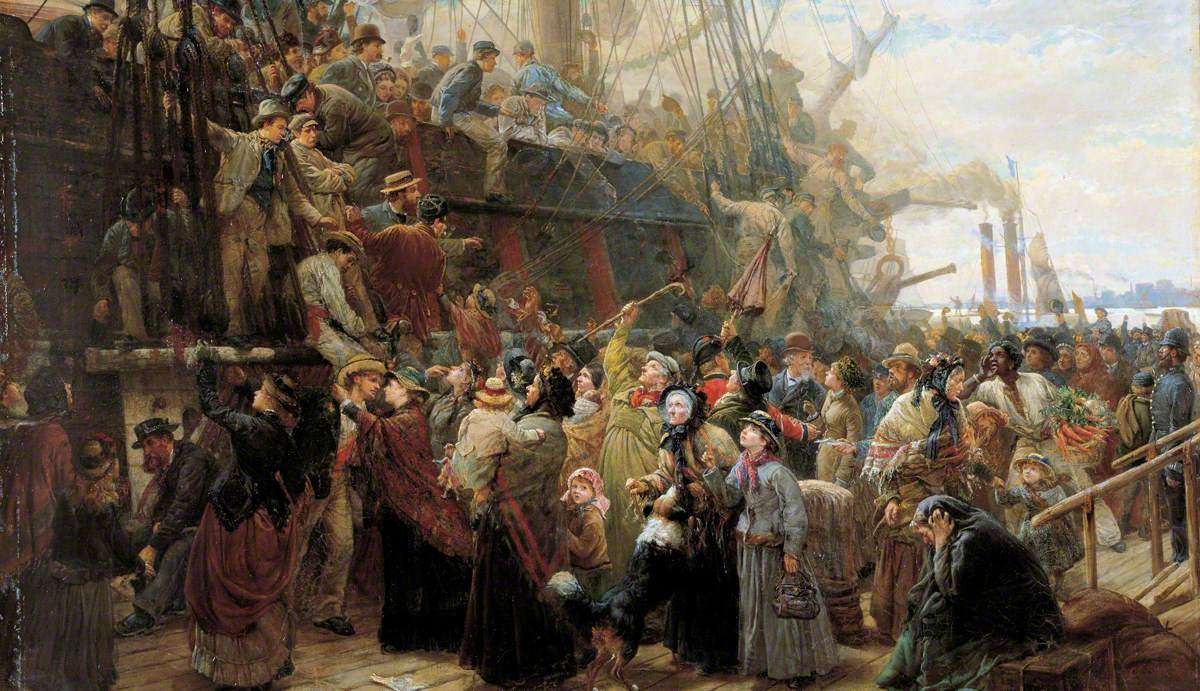
The Emigrant Ship

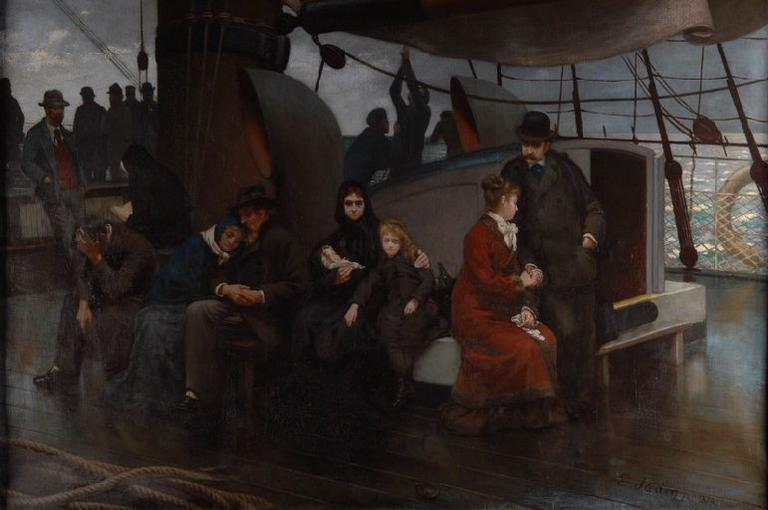
Emigrants on a ship

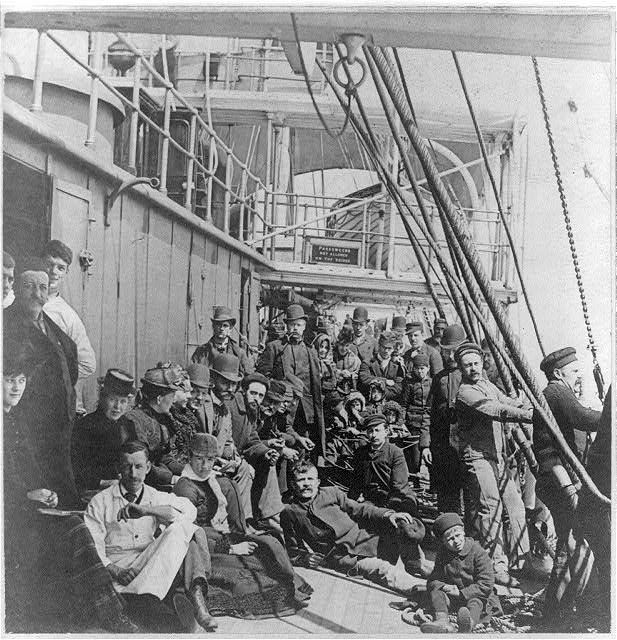
Emigrant Ship Crowded Lower Deck

Proper Accommodations on Steamships or Other Vessels – 22 Stat. 186–187 § 2

Berths for passengers
Regulations and rules for occupancy
Children
Females
Husband and wife
Males
Unmarried females
Families
Serial numbers for berths
Inspections of berths
Violation of Act penalties

Sanitation and Ventilation of Steamships or Other Vessels – 22 Stat. 187–188 § 3

Light and air to passenger decks and compartments
Hatchways
Companionway
Caboose with sufficient cooking capacity
Water closet
Privy location to be separated from passengers' spaces with constructed partitions
Violation of Act penalties

Nutrition on Steamships or Other Vessels – 22 Stat. 188 § 4

Wholesome food as fresh provisions
Meals per day
Short allowance and monetary penalty paid by the deck master
Mothers with infants
Tables and seats
Violation of Act penalties

Hospital on Steamships or Other Vessels – 22 Stat. 188 § 5

Hospital accommodations of two compartments
Qualified and competent surgeon or medical practitioner
Medicines and surgical appliances for diseases and accidents during sea voyages
Violation of Act penalties

Hygiene on Steamships or Other Vessels – 22 Stat. 188–189 § 6

Cleanliness and discipline to be maintained during voyage
Space on main deck for exercise of passengers
Violation of Act penalties

Navigational Crew on Steamships or Other Vessels – 22 Stat. 189 § 7

Officers and seamen prohibited from visiting passengers' compartments
Violation of section penalties
Section of Act posted on decks concerning fraternizing with navigational crew
Violation of Act penalties

Prohibited Articles on Steamships or Other Vessels – 22 Stat. 189 § 8

Dynamite
Gunpowder
Nitroglycerin
Vitriol
Other explosive compounds
Violation of Act penalties

Boarding Arriving Vessels Before Inspection – 22 Stat. 189–190 § 9

No person, on arrival of vessel in port, allowed to go aboard
Correct list of passengers, with deaths if any, to be delivered to first officer of customs on board
Duplicate of list to be delivered to collector of customs
Violation of Act penalties

Death on the High Seas – 22 Stat. 190 § 10

In case of death of passengers at sea, master of vessel to pay, money paid into the U.S. Treasury
Violation of Act penalties

Occupancy Integrity of Steamships or Other Vessels – 22 Stat. 190 § 11

Examination and inspection of vessel by collector of customs
Report made to the Secretary of the U.S. Treasury

Applicability of Act for Vessels Carrying Emigrants and Passengers – 22 Stat. 191 § 12

Provisions of this act apply to vessels carrying emigrants from United States to foreign countries
Clearance of vessels withheld until compliance with provisions of this Act
Violation of Act penalties

Violations of Act Provisions for Steamships or Other Vessels – 22 Stat. 191 § 13

Fines and penalties to be lien upon vessel

Effective Date of Act Provisions – 22 Stat. 191 § 14

Act shall come into effect ninety days after passage of Act
Act may be cited for all purposes as "The Passenger Act, eighteen hundred and eighty-two"

== Associated United States Federal Statutes ==
United States legislation relative to the Passenger Act of 1882.

U.S. Laws relative to Transportation Across Seas

Date of enactment	Public Law No.	U.S. Statute Citation	U.S. Bill No.	U.S. Presidential Administration
March 31, 1900	P.L. 56-120	31 Stat. 58	H.R. 5067	William McKinley
June 25, 1948	P.L. 80-772	62 Stat. 683	H.R. 3190	Harry S. Truman
August 26, 1983	P.L. 98-89	97 Stat. 600	S. 46	Ronald W. Reagan
November 25, 2002	P.L. 107-296	116 Stat. 2178	H.R. 5005	George W. Bush

== See also ==
1847 North American typhus epidemic
Carriage of Passengers Act of 1855
Coffin ship
Diseases and epidemics of the 19th century
Quarantine
Steerage Act of 1819

== Reading Bibliography ==
- Russell, William Clark (1893). "The Emigrant Ship – Volume I". Internet Archive. London, England: Sampson Low, Marston & Company.
- Russell, William Clark (1893). "The Emigrant Ship – Volume II". Internet Archive. London, England: Sampson Low, Marston & Company.
- Russell, William Clark (1893). "The Emigrant Ship – Volume III". Internet Archive. London, England: Sampson Low, Marston & Company.
- Emmons, Frederick E. (1985). American Passenger Ships: The Ocean Lines and Liners, 1873–1983. Newark, NJ: University of Delaware Press. ISBN 978-0874132489. LCCN 83050652. OCLC 492356630.
- Cairis, Nicholas T. (1992). Era of the Passenger Liner. London, UK; Boston, MA.: Pegasus Books. ISBN 978-0929624037. LCCN 92008575. OCLC 231560622 – via Internet Archive.
