= Passport Act of 1920 =

- Long title: An Act for expenses of regulating entry into the United States, in accordance with the provisions of the Act approved May 22, 1918, and Public Act Numbered 79 of the Sixty-sixth Congress, when the latter Act shall have become effective, $250,000, in addition to the remaining $150,000 of the sum appropriated by section 4 of said Public Act Numbered 79.
- Nicknames: Passport Control Act, 1920
- Enacted by: the 66th United States Congress
- Effective: July 1, 1920

Citations
- Public law: Pub. L. 66–238
- Statutes at Large: 41 Stat. 739 aka 41 Stat. 750

Codification
- Titles amended: 22 U.S.C.: Foreign Relations and Intercourse
- U.S.C. sections created: 22 U.S.C. ch. 4 §§ 214, 215, 216, 217

Legislative history
- Introduced in the House as H.R. 11960; Passed the House on January 26, 1920 (311-9); Reported by the joint conference committee on May 14, 1920; agreed to by the House on May 17, 1920 (97-194); Signed into law by President Woodrow Wilson on June 4, 1920

Major amendments
- Passport Act of 1926; Passport Act of 1956; Passport Act of 1968; Passport Act of 1971; Passport Act of 1974; Passport Act of 1982; Passport Services Act of 2005

Passport Act of 1920 or Passport Control Act, 1920 was a federal statute authored by the United States 66th Congress. The United States sixty-sixth congressional motion was coaxed by the League of Nations pursuing a global passport control protocol for international transits after the cessation of World War I. The Paris Conference on Passports & Customs Formalities and Through Tickets convened in Paris during October 1920 chartering a standardized passport booklet arrangement.

The legislation was an appropriations bill authorizing a fiscal policy for the United States Diplomatic and Consular Service. The Act of Congress established a fees schedule for identity documents and travel documents as related to United States passports and visas. The public law repealed section one of the Expatriation Act of 1907 discontinuing the issuance of passports to persons not declaring an American citizenship or a renunciation of citizenship in the continental United States.

The United States administrative law petitioned the requisite articles of the Wartime Measure Act of 1918 providing regulatory travel authority for United States foreign departures, domestic entries, and mandatory U.S. passport purposes. The Wartime Measure Act remained in effect through World War I whereas the United States 66th Congress drafted bill H.R. 9782, superseding public law 65-154 by passing the Aliens Restriction Act or public law 66-79 as signed by U.S. President Woodrow Wilson on November 10, 1919.

== Clauses of the Act ==
The Passport Act of 1920 contains five sections establishing regulations for the issuance and passport validity of American passports with an inclusion for United States travel visas and work visas.

Passport Control Act - 41 Stat. 750

Expenses of regulating entry into the United States

Fees for Passports and Visés - 41 Stat. 750 § I

Act effective from and after the 1st day of July, 1920
Fees established for application and issue
Retention of fee by State officials
Persons exempted

Alien Passports - 41 Stat. 750-751 § II

Fees for visé and application
Persons exempt

Validity of Passport or Visé - 41 Stat. 751 § III

Validity limited to two years
U.S. Secretary of State by regulation shall limit the passport or visé validity to a shorter period

Foreign Country Refusal to Visé a Passport - 41 Stat. 751 § IV

Return of passport fee if visé refused by foreign officer

Expatriation of Citizens and Their Protection Abroad - 41 Stat. 751 § V

Expatriation Act of 1907 § I
Authority to issue passports to persons not American citizens repealed

== See also ==
- 1920 in the United States
- Bureau of Consular Affairs
- Consular identification card
- Dillingham Commission
- Emergency Quota Act
- Freedom of movement
- Multiple citizenship
- Nansen passport
- National Origins Formula
- Passport fraud
- Passport stamp
- Rogers Act
- Socialist movements in the United States
- United States Passport Card

== Associated U.S. Statutes as Related to Immigration ==
U.S. Statutes Governing the Admission Quotas for Foreign Persons

| Date of Enactment | Public Law No. | U.S. Statute | U.S. Bill No. | U.S. President Administration |
|---|---|---|---|---|
| June 25, 1798 | P.L. 5-58 | 1 Stat. 570 | S. 26 | John Adams |
| March 26, 1910 | P.L. 61–107 | 36 Stat. 263 | H.R. 15816 | William H. Taft |
| February 5, 1917 | P.L. 64-301 | 39 Stat. 874 | H.R. 10384 | Woodrow Wilson |
| May 7, 1917 | P.L. 65–10 | 40 Stat. 39 | H.R. 2893 | Woodrow Wilson |
| May 9, 1918 | P.L. 65–144 | 40 Stat. 542 | H.R. 3132 | Woodrow Wilson |
| June 29, 1918 | Pub. Res. 65–34 | 40 Stat. 634 | H.J.Res. 255 | Woodrow Wilson |
| October 16, 1918 | P.L. 65-221 | 40 Stat. 1012 | H.R. 12402 | Woodrow Wilson |
| October 19, 1918 | Pub. Res. 65–44 | 40 Stat. 1014 | H.J.Res. 331 | Woodrow Wilson |
| November 10, 1919 | P.L. 66–79 | 41 Stat. 353 | H.R. 9782 | Woodrow Wilson |
| December 24, 1919 | Pub. Res. 66–27 | 41 Stat. 385 | S.J.Res. 131 | Woodrow Wilson |
| May 10, 1920 | P.L. 66–197 | 41 Stat. 593 | H.R. 6750 | Woodrow Wilson |
| June 5, 1920 | P.L. 66-254 | 41 Stat. 981 | S. 3566 | Woodrow Wilson |
| June 5, 1920 | P.L. 66-262 | 41 Stat. 1008 | H.R. 11214 | Woodrow Wilson |
| May 19, 1921 | P.L. 67–5 | 42 Stat. 5 | H.R. 4075 | Warren G. Harding |
| August 22, 1921 | Pub. Res. 67–16 | 42 Stat. 173 | H.J.Res. 153 | Warren G. Harding |
| November 23, 1921 | Pub. Res. 67–29 | 42 Stat. 325 | S.J.Res. 33 | Warren G. Harding |
| May 11, 1922 | Pub. Res. 67–55 | 42 Stat. 540 | H.J.Res. 268 | Warren G. Harding |
| May 26, 1922 | P.L. 67-227 | 42 Stat. 596 | H.R. 2193 | Warren G. Harding |
| December 27, 1922 | Pub. Res. 67–78 | 42 Stat. 1065 | H.J.Res. 279 | Warren G. Harding |
| June 7, 1924 | Pub. Res. 68–37 | 43 Stat. 669 | H.J.Res. 283 | Calvin Coolidge |
| February 25, 1925 | P.L. 68-464 | 43 Stat. 976 | H.R. 11957 | Calvin Coolidge |
| May 26, 1926 | P.L. 69-296 | 44 Stat. 657 | H.R. 11204 | Calvin Coolidge |
| July 3, 1926 | P.L. 69-459 | 44 Stat. 812 | H.R. 10661 | Calvin Coolidge |
| March 4, 1927 | Pub. Res. 69-69 | 44 Stat. 1455 | S.J.Res. 152 | Calvin Coolidge |
| March 31, 1928 | Pub. Res 70–20 | 45 Stat. 400 | S.J.Res. 113 | Calvin Coolidge |
| May 29, 1928 | Pub. Res. 70–61 | 45 Stat. 1009 | S.J.Res. 5 | Calvin Coolidge |
| March 4, 1929 | P.L. 70–1018 | 45 Stat. 1551 | S. 5094 | Calvin Coolidge |

== Statements of Woodrow Wilson ==
- Peters, Gerhard; Woolley, John T. "Woodrow Wilson: "Executive Order 2022 — Temporarily Abolishing Fees for Passports and Providing for Certification of Same.," August 14, 1914". The American Presidency Project. University of California - Santa Barbara.
- Peters, Gerhard; Woolley, John T. "Woodrow Wilson: "Executive Order 2285 — Requiring American Citizens Traveling Abroad to Procure Passports.," December 15, 1915". The American Presidency Project. University of California - Santa Barbara.
- Peters, Gerhard; Woolley, John T. "Woodrow Wilson: "Executive Order 2341 — Relating to Cancellation and Reissue of Passports.," March 13, 1916". The American Presidency Project. University of California - Santa Barbara.
- Peters, Gerhard; Woolley, John T. "Woodrow Wilson: "Proclamation 1473 — Issuance of Passports and Granting of Permits to Depart from and Enter the United States.," August 8, 1918". The American Presidency Project. University of California - Santa Barbara.
- Peters, Gerhard; Woolley, John T. "Woodrow Wilson: "Remarks to the Committee on Foreign Relations, United States Senate.," August 19, 1919". The American Presidency Project. University of California - Santa Barbara.

== Statements of Calvin Coolidge ==
- Peters, Gerhard; Woolley, John T. "Calvin Coolidge: "Excerpts of the President's News Conference ~ Questions of Immigration.," November 23, 1923". The American Presidency Project. University of California - Santa Barbara.

== Bibliography ==
- U.S. Department of State (1870). "Regulations Prescribed for Use of Consular Service of United States" [Consular Regulations of 1870]. HathiTrust Digital Library. United States Government Publishing Office. OCLC 820928803.
- Jones, Chester Lloyd (1906). "The Consular Service of the United States: Its History and Activities". HathiTrust Digital Library. The John C. Winston Co. OCLC 11939029.
- U.S. Department of State (1924). "Diplomatic and Consular Service of the United States". Internet Archive. United States Government Publishing Office. OCLC 6712149.
- Knickerbocker, Hubert Renfro (1931). "Fighting the Red Trade Menace". HathiTrust Digital Library. New York City, New York: Dodd, Mead and Company. OCLC 1800737.
- Lane, Arthur Henry (1934). "The Alien Menace: A Statement Of The Case". Internet Archive. London, United Kingdom: Boswell Publishing Co. OCLC 5866332.
- Library of Congress, Legislative Reference Service (July 10, 1958). "Passports and the Right to Travel: A Study of Administrative Control of the Citizen". HathiTrust Digital Library. U.S. Government Printing Office. LCCN 66062993. OCLC 12085623.
