= An Act to Encourage Immigration =

U.S. federal law

Citations
- Public law: Pub. L. 38–246
- Statutes at Large: 13 Stat. 385

Legislative history
- Introduced in the Senate as S. 125 by John Sherman (R-OH) on February 18, 1864; Passed the House on; Passed the Senate on June 27, 1864; Signed into law by President Abraham Lincoln on July 4, 1864

An Act to Encourage Immigration (Pub. L. 38–246, H.R. 411, 13 Stat. 385, enacted July 4, 1864) was a federal law passed by the 38th United States Congress and signed into law by President Abraham Lincoln. It was the first major American law to encourage immigration.

== Background ==
The Naturalization Act of 1790 was the first federal law to establish uniform qualification standards for naturalization of immigrants to the USA. Those standards were made more strict by the Naturalization Act of 1795. The Naturalization Act, one of the four laws included in the 1798 Alien and Sedition Acts, raised the qualification standards even further while giving the president broad powers of detention and deportation over foreign residents. The Naturalization Law of 1802 returned to the 1795 standards. One of the four 1798 laws, the Alien Enemies Act, remains in effect, usable during wartime.

In the 1850's, grassroots nativist feelings led to the establishment of the new Know Nothing political party. In its 1860 party platform, the Republican Party (also created in the 1850s) adopted the opposite position. The platform supporting Abraham Lincoln's presidential bid included seventeen "declarations". Declaration fourteen supported immigration and defended immigrant rights.

In December of 1863, Lincoln delivered his third annual message to Congress. He reiterated his intent to defend immigrants against unlawful claims, while also chiding foreign residents who abused the naturalization process to avoid citizen obligations - chiefly the military draft in effect during the Civil war.

== Text of the Act ==
Be it enacted by the Senate and House of Representatives of the United States of America in Congress assembled, That the President of the United States is hereby authorized, by and with the advice and consent of the Senate, to appoint a Commissioner of Immigration, who shall be subject to the direction of the Department of State, shall hold his office for four years, and shall receive a salary at the rate of $2,500 a year. The said Commissioner may employ not more than three clerks, of such grade as the Secretary of State shall designate, to be appointed by him, with the approval of the Secretary of State, and to hold their offices at his pleasure.

SEC. 2. And be it further enacted, That all contracts that shall be made by emigrants to the United States in foreign countries, in conformity to regulations that may be established by the said Commissioner, whereby emigrants shall pledge the wages of their labor for a term not exceeding twelve months to repay the expenses of their emigration, shall be held to be valid in law, and may be enforced in the courts of the United States, or of the several States and Territories; and such advances, if so stipulated in the contract, and the contract be recorded in the Recorder's office in the county where the emigrant shall settle, shall operate as a lien upon any land thereafter acquired by the emigrant, whether under the Homestead Law when the title is consummated or on property otherwise acquired, until liquidated by the emigrant; but not being herein contained shall be deemed to authorize any contract contravening the Constitution of the United States or creating in any way the relation of Slavery or servitude.

SEC. 3. And be it further enacted; That no emigrant to the United States who shall arrive after the passage of this act shall be compulsively enrolled for military service during the existing insurrection, unless such emigrant shall voluntarily renounce under oath his allegiance to the country of his birth, and declare his intention to become a citizen of the United States.

SEC. 4. And be it further enacted, That there shall be established in the City of New-York an office to be known as the United States Emigrant Office; and there shall be appointed, by and with the advice and consent of the Senate, an officer for said City, to be known as Superintendent of Immigration, at an annual salary of two thousand dollars; and the said Superintendent may employ a clerk of the first class; and such Superintendent shall, under the direction of the Commissioner of Immigration, make contracts with the different railroads and transportation companies of the United States for transportation tickets, to be furnished to such immigrants, and to be paid for by them, and shall, under such rules as may be prescribed by the Commissioner of Immigration, protect such immigrants from imposition and fraud, and shall furnish them such information and facilities as will enable them to proceed in the cheapest and most expeditious manner to the place of their destination. And such Superintendent of Immigration shall perform such other duties as may be prescribed by the Commissioner of Immigration: provided that the duties hereby imposed upon the Superintendent in the City of New-York shall not be held to affect the powers and duties of the Commissioner of the Immigration of the State of New-York. And it shall be the duty of said Superintendent in the City of New-York, to see that the provisions of the act commonly known as the Passenger Act, are strictly complied with, and all breaches thereof punished according to law.

SEC. 5. And be it further enacted. That no person shall be qualified to fill, any office under this act who shall be directly or indirectly interested in any corporation having lands for sale to immigrants, or in the carrying or transportation of immigrants, either from foreign countries to the United States and its Territories or to any part thereof, or who shall receive any fee or reward, or the promise thereof, for any service performed or any benefit rendered to any person or persons in the line or his duty under this act. And if any officer provided for by this act shall receive from any person or company any fee or reward, or promise thereof, for any services performed or any benefit rendered to any person or persons in the line of his duty under this act, he shall, upon conviction, be fined one thousand dollars or be imprisoned, not to exceed three years, at the discretion of a court of competent jurisdiction, and forever after be ineligible to hold any office of honor, trust, or profit in the United States.

SEC. 6. And be it further enacted, that said Commissioner of Immigration shall, at the commencement of each annual meeting of Congress, submit a detailed report of the foreign immigration during the preceding year, and a detailed account of all expenditures under this act.

SEC. 7. And be it further enacted, that the sum of twenty-five thousand dollars, or so much thereof as may be necessary, in the judgment of the President, is hereby appropriated, out of any money in the treasury not otherwise appropriated, for the purpose of carrying the provisions of this act into effect.

APPROVED, July 4, 1864.
