= Reed–Jenkins Act =

- Other short titles: Immigration Act of 1917 Amendment
- Long title: An Act to amend section 24 of the Immigration Act of 1917.
- Nicknames: Immigrant Inspectors Classification Act of 1928
- Enacted by: the 70th United States Congress
- Effective: May 29, 1928

Citations
- Public law: Pub. L. 70–574
- Statutes at Large: 45 Stat. 954

Codification
- Titles amended: 8 U.S.C.: Aliens and Nationality
- U.S.C. sections amended: 8 U.S.C. ch. 6, subch. I § 109

Legislative history
- Introduced in the Senate as S. 2370 by David A. Reed (R–PA) on January 31, 1928; Committee consideration by Senate Immigration, House Immigration and Naturalization; Passed the Senate on February 23, 1928 (Passed); Passed the House on May 21, 1928 (Passed); Signed into law by President Calvin Coolidge on May 29, 1928

The Reed–Jenkins Act was a statute enacted on May 29, 1928, during the 70th United States Congress. It repealed previous laws that provided federal funds for Americanization programs supporting Native American schools, educational experimentation agencies, and Native agency farms. The law was sponsored by Senator David A. Reed (Republican) of Pennsylvania and Representative Thomas A. Jenkins (Republican) of Ohio.

== See also ==
- Emergency Quota Act
- Immigration Act of 1924
- Passport Act of 1926
