= 1991 Armed Forces Immigration Adjustment Act =

The Armed Forces Immigration Adjustment Act 1991, also known as the Six and Six Program, was enacted on October 1, 1991. The Act amended the Immigration and Nationality Act of 1965, also known as the Hart-Celler Act.

The Armed Forces Immigration Adjustment Act allows aliens who have served in the United States Armed Forces for at least period of 12 years to be granted special immigrant status. Immigrants who have served for 6 years may also obtain special immigrant status if they re-enlist so their total service commitment is 12 years. Special immigration status may also be awarded to those who have a "recommendation by the executive department under which such alien served or is serving."

There are no numerical limits on how many special immigrant status visas can be issued. Special immigrant status visa holders are able to obtain permanent resident status, and the same applies to their spouses and children.

Some applicants for special immigrant status are also immediately eligible for naturalization as US citizens.

== Provisions ==
There are a number of requirements that must be met before a person is able to apply for special immigrant status.
1. An applicant must have served on active duty in the US Armed Forces after October 15, 1978, for a period or periods totaling 12 years, or, for six years if he or she reenlists to fulfill a total active duty service obligation of at least 12 years;

a. The applicant must show proof of service. The documents must be issued by the authorized "official of the executive department in which the applicant serves or has served, certifying that the applicant has the required honorable service and recommending special immigrant status"; and
b. A birth certificate or equivalent must be produced to prove the applicant is a national of an independent state with a treaty or agreement (in effect before October 1, 1991) that allows its nationals to enlist in the US Armed Forces.

i. "The United States has a special agreements with the Philippines, Micronesia, and the Marshall Islands to allow natives of those countries to serve in our Armed Forces".

2. Spouses and children must also produce extensive documentation to gain special immigrant status.

a. In order for a spouse or child to gain special immigrant status, the relationship must have existed before the principal applicant's application was approved for special immigrant status.

i. For spouses and children that are already in the United States, but were not included in the principal applicant's application, the spouse or child must file a Form I-485 and an application for permanent residence, with the Department of Homeland Security.
ii. Spouses and children who are not currently living in the United States, the principal applicant needs to file Form I-824 and an Application for Action on an Approved Application or Petition".

== History ==
=== Hart-Cellar Act ===
The Hart-Cellar Act (the Immigration and Nationality Act 1965) replaced the Immigration Act 1924 and eliminated the quota system put in place by the 1924 Act.

The Hart-Cellar Act created a preference system that recognized skills and family relationships.

"[A]ccording to De Genova, the 1965 legislation was celebrated as a liberal reform of the racist and exclusionary national-origins quota system that had been in place without substantial modification since 1882" 29 September 2014.

The new system set numerical restrictions on visas. However, it excluded immediate relatives of U.S. citizens or special immigrants born in independent nations, former citizens of the US, ministers, or employees of the U.S. government abroad.

=== Immigration Act 1990 ===
The Immigration Act of 1990 increased the number of employment-based visas that could be obtained by immigrants from 54,000 to 140,000 per year and was heralded as "the most significant reform of the legal immigration system of the United States in nearly 40 years".

The objective of the 1990 Act was to improve "permanent immigration opportunities for most business persons, professionals and skilled workers" and its employment-based immigration changes became effective on October 1, 1991"

=== Armed Forces Immigrant Adjustment Act 1991 ===
The treaty that allowed Filipinos to enlist in the United States Armed Forces is no longer in effect. However, "special immigrant status is still a possible routed to permanent residency for some people without other options".

Since eligibility under the Act was based on the status of the immigrant, service members were immediately eligible for naturalization based on service. However, foreign service members weren't well informed about the benefits of the Act.

Rogie Delmando, a Filipino service member who positively benefited from the Act, argued that "service members should be advised of this naturalization option immediately available to them if he or she has not filed for naturalization yet". Delmando also suggested other routes which might be better for foreign service members:

a. some sailors from the Philippines who served during the Persian Gulf conflict can qualify for naturalization based upon service during a period of military hostilities;
b. applying for special immigrant status under the Armed Forces Immigration Adjustment Act would normally be unnecessary because a more direct route to citizenship exists through service during the Persian Gulf conflict or another designated period of hostilities.
