= Chinese Student Protection Act of 1992 =

US law easing residency for Chinese students

- Long title: An Act to provide for the adjustment of status under the Immigration and Nationality Act of certain nationals of the People's Republic of China unless conditions permit their return in safety to that foreign state.
- Acronyms (colloquial): CSPA
- Nicknames: Chinese Student Protection Act of 1991
- Enacted by: the 102nd United States Congress
- Effective: October 9, 1992

Citations
- Public law: 102-404
- Statutes at Large: 106 Stat. 1969

Codification
- Titles amended: 8 U.S.C.: Aliens and Nationality
- U.S.C. sections amended: 8 U.S.C. ch. 12, subch. II § 1255

Legislative history
- Introduced in the Senate as S. 1216 by Slade Gorton (R–WA) on June 4, 1991; Committee consideration by Senate Judiciary, House Judiciary; Passed the Senate on May 21, 1992 (passed voice vote); Passed the House on August 10, 1992 (agreed voice vote) with amendment; Senate agreed to House amendment on September 23, 1992 (agreed voice vote); Signed into law by President George H. W. Bush on October 9, 1992

Prior to the Chinese Student Protection Act of 1992 (CSPA), President George H.W Bush issued Executive Order 12711 in 1990. This policy implementation was solidified by the actual Act in 1992. The Act's main sponsors were Nancy Pelosi (D-CA) for the House of Representatives and Senator Slade Gorton (R-WA) for the Senate. The Chinese Student Protection Act of 1992 was passed on May 21, 1992, by the Senate, and passed by the House of Representatives on August 10, 1992. President George H. W. Bush signed it into law on October 9, 1992. The Chinese Student Protection Act became Public Law 102-404, 106 Stat. 1969.

The Chinese Student Protection Act established permanent residence for Chinese nationals that were in the United States between June 5, 1989, and April 11, 1990. The Act was targeted towards students. The CSPA was prompted by the political repression the Chinese faced after the 1989 Tiananmen Square protests and massacre. Chinese students who were in the United States during the time of the protests participated in TV interviews, demonstration rallies, and were featured in newspaper articles. Chinese nationals were eligible to apply for permanent residency, even with expired passports. Over the years, the Act granted green cards to an estimated number of 54,000 Chinese nationals.

The green cards were called "blood cards" by the Chinese, as a “pejorative term for the green cards awarded to their countrymen who, by virtue of their presence in the U.S. at the time, were eligible for the Chinese Student Protection Act.”

== Criticisms and Pitfalls of the Act ==
Although CSPA was enacted to prevent political persecution of Chinese students, the act also extended its protection to immigrants that came to America illegally, with which many Americans disagreed. Additionally, the permanent resident statute of the Act subtracted spots for Chinese immigrants to come in later years.

The executive director of Asia Watch, a large human-rights organization presence in China, spoke out against the CSPA, calling it unnecessary. According to the executive director, the only students that may have needed protection from their native country would be those that participated in televised or advertised speeches and those who wrote articles.

A document from the U.S. Immigration and Naturalization noted, “According to a cable from the U.S. Consul in Shanghai, China, over 120 returning [students]… who had come to China for various reasons were interviewed [as they prepared to go back to the U.S.]. Not one of them reported a problem.” These students that returned home for a visit during the time that this Act was in effect were still eligible to apply for green cards.

== Bills Related to the Act ==
October 23, 1997
H.R. 2728, a bill to extend the provisions of the Chinese Student Protection Act of 1992 to certain aliens who entered the United States without inspection. In summary, the bill wished to grant more Chinese students after the original 1992 Act status. This bill also included that the number of Chinese allowed to enter the country not be lowered due to this bill. The bill was to be cited as the Chinese Student Protection Act of 1997, and was brought before the House of Representatives. The bill was introduced through the Judiciary Committee, but no action was taken.

June 4, 2009
S. 1182, a bill to amend the Chinese Student Protection Act of 1992, would “eliminate the provision requiring the reduction of annual People’s Republic of China (PRC) immigrant visas to offset status adjustments under such Act.” The bill was read twice in the Senate and referred to the Judiciary Committee but no other action was made.

2017
Bills entitled "Fairness for High-Skilled Immigrants Act of 2017" were introduced into the House (H.R. 392) and Senate (S. 281) of the 115th United States Congress. These bills would amend the CSPA “to eliminate the provision requiring the reduction of annual Chinese immigrant visas to offset status adjustments under such Act.”

== Effects on the Chinese in America ==
Studies show that the Chinese benefited from the CSPA. “Among those with at least a Bachelor’s degree, workers from mainland China experienced hourly earnings gains of 18 percent during the 1990s relative to the control group. The relative gain was 21 percent among mainland Chinese women and 16 percent among mainland Chinese men. Relative employment rates rose substantially post-CSPA for mainland Chinese male and female college graduates.” (Institute for International Integration Studies, Trinity College Dublin)

== Effects on the United States Labor Market ==
Despite the critiques of the CSPA, studies have shown that there was a largely positive impact in the area of beneficiaries' labor market. Theoretically, benefits for recipients of CSPA work eligibility include higher income, flexibility, the ability to work legally, and possibility for longer-term employment. “The CSPA appears to have raised the employment rate by 7 percentage points among college-graduate PRC immigrants relative to those from Hong Kong, controlling for other factors, and to have boosted relative hourly earnings growth by 17 to 24 percent.” (Institute for International Integration Studies) Women and highly educated immigrants benefited most.
