= Wartime Measure Act of 1918 =

US fed. legislation

- Long title: An Act to prevent in time of war departure from or entry into the United States contrary to the public safety.
- Nicknames: Foreign Travel Restrictions Act of 1918
- Enacted by: the 65th United States Congress
- Effective: May 22, 1918

Citations
- Public law: Pub. L. 65–154
- Statutes at Large: 40 Stat. 559

Legislative history
- Introduced in the House as H.R. 10264 by Henry D. Flood (D–VA); Signed into law by President Woodrow Wilson on May 22, 1918

Wartime Measure Act of 1918 was United States federal legislation deeming wartime travel as an unlawful act when touring without a United States passport.

== Background ==
The passport has long been used as an instrument of international travel, not only in the United States, but also all throughout the world. On August 18, 1856, Congress resolved that passports were reserved for citizens of the United States alone. Congress also gave the Secretary of State "sole authority to issue passports and made it illegal for any other authority to issue a passport or a document in the nature of a passport." The first instance of strict regulations on passport travel in the United States was during the Civil War, attributable to Secretary of State William Seward. These regulations required that anyone entering or exiting the United States have a passport, including immigrants, who had to have their documentation signed by a U.S. minister or consul. There was contention centered upon the 1856 Act that drew from three main components: passports were only issued to citizens of the United States, the authority to issue passports was vested in the Secretary of State, and that very authority came with incredible discretion. Further, problems arose in the verification of one's citizenship, as "government officials and applicants often sought to turn the vagaries of citizenship to their advantage."

On July 26, 1917, the State and Labor Departments issued a joint order that attempted to "legally control the entry of aliens to the United States," by requiring them to have visas issued by a United States consul. However, the Attorney General later determined that the executive branch, namely the President, did not have the authority to implement such regulations. This led to the second instance in which strict regulations were placed on passport travel for citizens of the United States. On May 22, 1918 the Wartime Measure Act, also known as the Travel Control Act and the Flood Passport Act, was signed by Woodrow Wilson just one year following the United States' entrance into World War I. Following the Act, the continued discretion of passport officials made it nearly "impossible to travel in the 1920s and 1930s without securing the necessary documents." The necessity of this Act stemmed primarily from the "unregulated flow of people across borders" during the war, which was seen as a potential national security threat for countries around the world, including the United States.

== Other provisions ==
What is most commonly referenced from the Act is Section II containing the passport restriction condition. However, the Act itself has many other provisions as well.

The 65th United States Congress approved the Act on May 22, 1918 in Session 2, as Chapter 81. The primary objective was to "prevent in time of war departure from or entry into the United States contrary to the public safety." It vested power in the President to impose restrictions on the entry and departure of persons within the jurisdiction of the United States when at war. Essentially, the Act was open-ended: "If the President shall find that the public safety requires that restrictions and prohibitions in addition to those provided otherwise than by this Act…it shall, until otherwise ordered by the President or Congress, be unlawful":

- For any alien person to leave or come into the United States "except under such reasonable rules, regulations, and orders," approved by the President,
- For assisting the entry or departure of another while knowing or suspecting that it would be "forbidden by this Act,"
- For anyone to lie or falsify information relating to themselves or another person in attempt to gain permission to leave or enter the United States,
- For anyone to provide, attempt to provide, or assist in providing anyone with a permit to depart or enter the United States that was "not issued and designed for his use,"
- For anyone to themselves use a permit or issuance of permission for entry or exit from the United States that was not intended for them,
- For the forging of such documentation required for entry into and departure from the United States,
- For the forging of such documentation for another person required for entry into and departure from the United States.

=== Section II ===
Most commonly known and referenced, this section required that any citizen of the United States obtain a passport for travel to and from the United States.

=== Section III ===
This section outlined the punishments faced should anyone violate any of the components of the Act. If convicted, one could face a fine not exceeding $10,000, or if a natural citizen, they could face no more than 20 years imprisonment, or both. Additionally, any "officer, director or agent of any corporation" convicted of a violation could be punished by such fine or imprisonment, or both. Any "vehicle or vessel, together with its or her appurtenances, equipment, tackle, apparel, and furniture, concerned in any such violation, shall be forfeited to the United States."

=== Section IV and Conclusion ===
The United States is defined as including the Canal Zone, and all territories and their respective waters, "continental or insular." A person is defined as any "individual, partnership, association, company, or other unincorporated body of individuals, or corporation, or body politic."

== Aftermath ==
An article from the New York Times, published August 26, 1919, quoted President Woodrow Wilson's request to Congress to extend the passport provision for one more year. His rationale was that a lift on travel restrictions to and from the United States would welcome an increase in immigrants, including those "undesirable, from the point of view of becoming future citizens," and those whose "origin and affiliations make it inadvisable that they should be permitted to enter" the country. The extension, necessitating a $750,000 appropriation, would, according to President Wilson, maintain a necessary system of passport control.

Another New York Times article headlined "Enemy Aliens Need No Permit Now to Quit the United States," also discussed the issue of travel control during this time. The President amended a previous Executive Order, so that "hostile or enemy aliens" that wished to leave the United States no longer needed permission for departure, unless stated by the Secretary of State. A passport from their country of origin was sufficient, so long as it was dated within one year prior to the desired date of departure.

== See also ==
- 1919 United States anarchist bombings
- First Red Scare
- Immigration Act of 1903
- Immigration Act of 1918
- Passport Act of 1782
- Spanish flu
