= Passport Act of 1926 =

United States federal law

- Long title: An Act to regulate the issue and validity of passports and for other purposes.
- Enacted by: the 69th United States Congress
- Effective: July 3, 1926

Citations
- Public law: Pub. L. 69–493
- Statutes at Large: 44 Stat. 887, Chap. 772

Codification
- Acts amended: Passport Act of 1920
- Titles amended: 22 U.S.C.: Foreign Relations and Intercourse
- U.S.C. sections created: 22 U.S.C. ch. 4 § 211 et seq.

Legislative history
- Introduced in the House as H.R. 12495 by R. Walton Moore (D–VA) on June 3, 1926; Committee consideration by House Foreign Affairs; Passed the House on June 21, 1926 (Passed); Passed the Senate on July 3, 1926 (Passed); Signed into law by President Calvin Coolidge on July 3, 1926

Major amendments
- Passport Act of 1930; Passport Act of 1932

Passport Act of 1926, 22 U.S.C § 211, is a United States statue authorizing the issuance of United States passports and visas for a validity of two years from the issue date. The Act of Congress provided the United States Department of State authority to limit the validity of a passport or visa in accordance with the Immigration Act of 1924.

The H.R. 12495 legislation was passed by the 69th U.S. Congressional session and enacted into law by the 30th President of the United States Calvin Coolidge on July 3, 1926.

== International Relations and U.S. President Calvin Coolidge ==
- Peters, Gerhard; Woolley, John T. "Calvin Coolidge: "Executive Order 4224 1/2 - Waiver or Reduction of Application and Visa Fees for Non-Immigrants.," May 15, 1925". The American Presidency Project. University of California - Santa Barbara.
- Peters, Gerhard; Woolley, John T. "Calvin Coolidge: "Executive Order 4359-A - Citizenship, Passports and Protection.," December 19, 1925". The American Presidency Project. University of California - Santa Barbara.

== See also ==
- Consular identification card
- Emergency Quota Act
- Passport Act of 1782
- Reed–Jenkins Act
- United States Foreign Service

== Bibliography ==
- U.S. Department of State (1896). "Regulations Prescribed for Use of Consular Service of United States" [Consular Regulations of 1896]. Internet Archive. United States Government Publishing Office. OCLC 10580152.
- U.S. Department of State (1924). "Diplomatic and Consular Service of the United States". Internet Archive. United States Government Publishing Office. OCLC 6712149.
