= Executive Order 12711 =

1990 United States executive order

Executive Order 12711 was issued by American president George H. W. Bush on 11 April 1990. It deferred deportation of Chinese nationals and their direct dependents who were in the US between 5 June 1989 and 11 April 1990, waived the 2-year home country residency requirement, and gave them employment authorization through 1 January 1994.

It was issued as part of the international backlash against the People's Republic of China (PRC) in response for its suppression of the 1989 Tiananmen Square protests that occurred 4 June of that year. It was made permanent when the Chinese Student Protection Act was passed in 1992.

== See also ==
- Chinese American history
