= Immigration Act of 1918 =

American immigration law

- Other short titles: Dillingham-Hardwick Act
- Long title: An Act to exclude and expel from the United States aliens who are members of the anarchistic and similar classes.
- Nicknames: Alien Anarchists Exclusion Act of 1918
- Enacted by: the 65th United States Congress
- Effective: October 16, 1918

Citations
- Public law: Pub. L. 65–221
- Statutes at Large: 40 Stat. 1012

Legislative history
- Introduced in the House as H.R. 12402 by John L. Burnett (D–AL); Signed into law by President Woodrow Wilson on October 16, 1918

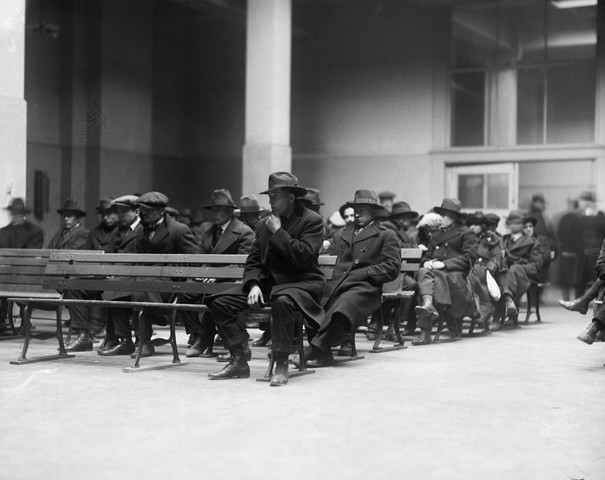
Suspected "radicals" arrested during the Palmer Raids awaiting deportation hearings Ellis Island, January 1920

The United States Immigration Act of 1918 (ch. 186, 40 Stat. 1012) was enacted on October 16, 1918. It is also known as the Dillingham-Hardwick Act. It was intended to correct what President Woodrow Wilson's administration considered to be deficiencies in previous laws, in order to enable the government to deport undesirable aliens, specifically anarchists, communists, labor organizers, and similar activists.

== Background ==
During the Great War, officials at the Department of Justice were frustrated in their attempts to suppress anarchist activity by their inability to gain convictions of even self-professed anarchists under current legislation, notably the Immigration Act of 1903 (also known as the Anarchist Exclusion Act) and the Immigration Act of 1917. U.S. authorities in President Woodrow Wilson's administration determined that their best opportunity to detain and remove foreign-born anarchists, antiwar protesters, and members of radical labor unions such as the Industrial Workers of the World, from the United States lay in the authority of the Department of Immigration to deport individuals under an extremely broad definition of anarchism. They could use administrative procedures that did not require due process in courts of law.

Working together, officials at the Department of Justice and the Bureau of Immigration drafted legislation designed to remedy the defects in current legislation. They defined anarchism broadly enough to cover all forms of activity related to its advocacy, including membership in or affiliation with any organization or group that advocated opposition to all forms of organized government. The new legislation removed the protection in prior law that aliens (persons without citizenship) who had resided in the United States for more than five years were not subject to deportation. The bill quickly was passed by the House of Representatives. While waiting for Senate action, representatives of the two sponsoring government agencies held meetings to develop a strategy for handling the "disposition of cases of alien anarchists, some of whom are Italian anarchists and others Industrial Workers of the World and Russian Union workers, now pending."

Senator William Borah of Idaho was one of the few opposed, but he was not prepared to try to prevent a vote. The Senate passed a bill that included additional punishment for anyone deported who returned to the United States. The punishment for that was a prison term of five years, followed by deportation once again.

== Definition of anarchist ==
The act expanded and elaborated the brief definition found in the Anarchist Exclusion Act 15 years earlier to read:

(a) aliens who are anarchists;
(b) aliens who advise, advocate, or teach, or who are members of, or affiliated with, any organization, society, or group, that advises, advocates, or teaches opposition to all organized government;
(c) aliens who believe in, advise, advocate, or teach, or who are members of, or affiliated with, any organization, association, society, or group, that believes in, advises, advocates, or teaches:

(1) the overthrow by force or violence of the Government of the United States or of all forms of law, or
(2) the duty, necessity, or propriety of the unlawful assaulting or killing of any officer or officers, either of specific individuals or of officers generally, of the Government of the United States or of any other organized government, because of his or their official character, or
(3) the unlawful damage, injury, or destruction of property, or
(4) sabotage;

(d) aliens who write, publish, or cause to be written or published, or who knowingly circulate, distribute, print, or display, or knowingly cause to be circulated, distributed, printed, or displayed, or knowingly have in their possession for the purpose of circulation, distribution, publication, or display any written or printed matter, advising, advocating, or teaching opposition to all government, or advising, advocating, or teaching:

(1) the overthrow by force or violence of the Government of the United States or of all forms of law, or
(2) the duty, necessity, or propriety of the unlawful assaulting or killing of any officer or officers of the Government of the United States or of any other government, or
(3) the unlawful damage, injury, or destruction of property, or
(4) sabotage;

(e) aliens who are members of, or affiliated with, any organization, association, society, or group, that writes, circulates, distributes, prints, publishes, or displays, or causes to be written, circulated, distributed, printed, published, or displayed, or that has in its possession for the purpose of circulation, distribution, publication, or display, any written or printed matter of the character in subdivision (d).

== Effects ==
In 1919, The New York Times reported that in the fiscal year 1918, two anarchists were denied entry to the U.S., 37 were deported, and 55 were awaiting deportation. The Times published an editorial that contrasted those low numbers with the degree of public disturbance across the country by activists: "It appears to be difficult to find alien anarchists. Yet those in the United States seldom practice long either silence or concealment."

Among the more notorious anarchists deported under the Act were Luigi Galleani and several of his adherents. Galleani's followers, known as Galleanists, were responsible for a bombing campaign that would last from 1914 until 1932. It reached its peak in the deadly bombing campaigns of 1919 and Wall Street bombing in 1920. Emma Goldman and Alexander Berkman, both resident aliens, were among 250 aliens deported in 1919 pursuant to the Act. They had been convicted because of their encouragement of men to resist draft registration and conscription.

After more than 4,000 alleged anarchists were arrested for deportation under the act, the Department of Labor released most of those arrested. Acting Secretary of Labor Louis Freeland Post was threatened with impeachment for his department's findings in favor of continued residence in the U.S. of persons charged in deportation cases. A total of 556 persons were eventually deported under the Immigration Act of 1918. The exclusion of anarchist immigrants was recodified with the Immigration and Nationality Act of 1952. By the late 20th century, the threat was believed reduced. Such provisions were largely repealed by the Immigration Act of 1990. Current U.S. immigration law does not explicitly mention anarchists, but anarchists are still banned from becoming U.S. citizens.

== See also ==
- Anarchist economics
- Anarchy in International Relations
- Fourteen Points
- League of Nations
- USAT Buford
- Wartime Measure Act of 1918
- Wilsonianism
