= Steerage Act of 1819 =

US federal legislation

- Long title: An Act regulating passenger ships and vessels.
- Nicknames: Manifest of Immigrants Act of 1819
- Enacted by: the 15th United States Congress
- Effective: January 1, 1820

Citations
- Public law: Pub. L. 15–46
- Statutes at Large: 3 Stat. 488a, Chap. 46

Legislative history
- Introduced in the House as H.R. 128 by Louis McLane (F–DE) on March 10, 1818; Passed the House on December 17, 1818 (Passed); Signed into law by President James Monroe on March 2, 1819

The Steerage Act of 1819, also called the Manifest of Immigrants Act, was an Act passed by the United States federal government on March 2, 1819, effective January 1, 1820. Its full name is An Act regulating passenger ships and vessels. It was the first law in the United States regulating the conditions of transportation used by people arriving and departing by sea. In addition to regulating conditions in ships, the act also required ship captains to deliver and report a list of passengers with their demographic information to the district collector. The Act was passed near the end of the term of the fifteenth United States Congress and signed into law by then United States President James Monroe. The Act was augmented by many additional Acts starting 1847 and finally repealed and superseded by the Carriage of Passengers Act of 1855. At the time of passage of the Act, the United States had no laws restricting immigration. In fact, the first federal legislation regulating immigration, the Page Act of 1875, was over 50 years in the future.

== Historical context ==
=== Growth of the United States as an attractive immigrant destination ===
When the Act was passed, Europe was entering a period of relative peace after many wars, and the United States was also becoming a more stable and prosperous nation. The volume of migration from Europe to the United States was increasing. Many of these migrants arrived in cramped conditions, leading to concerns surrounding the conditions of voyage that would lead to the passage of the Act. Supporters of the Act in the U.S. House of Representatives, in December of 1818, in "urging the need for such legislation...reported that during the preceeding [sic?] year 1,000 out of 5,000 persons who had sailed from Antwerp died on the voyage."

=== Previous regulations related to non-citizens ===
Until this Act, the United States Congress had not limited voluntary migration, but there had been a few related areas where regulations had been imposed:

- The Naturalization Act of 1790 established a uniform rule of naturalization (conversion of a non-U.S. citizen to U.S. citizenship) that included a two-year residency requirement for aliens who are "free white persons" of good moral character. This was increased to 14 years by the Alien and Sedition Acts of 1798, but then reduced to five years in 1802.
- The Alien and Sedition Acts also permitted then President, Federalist John Adams, to deport foreigners deemed to be dangerous.
- The Act Prohibiting Importation of Slaves banned the importation of new slaves into the United States. Passed in 1807, it went in effect on January 1, 1808.

== Provisions ==
=== Regulations on the conditions of travel ===
The first three sections of the Act regulated the conditions of travel, to prevent overcrowding and unsanitary conditions on ships:

- Section 1: A limit of two passengers for every five tons of ship burden.
- Section 2: The master of the vessel was required to pay a penalty of $150 for each passenger carried above the maximum capacity.
- Section 3: For all ships departing the United States, at least 60 gallons of water, 100 pounds of bread, 100 pounds of salted provisions, and one gallon of vinegar for every passenger (at the time of departure).

=== Requirement to submit a manifest of passengers ===
Section 4 of the Act required ship captains or masters to report a list of all passengers taken on board abroad, including name, sex, age, and occupation. The report was also to include the number of passengers who had died on board the ship during the voyage. The presence of this section has led to the act sometimes being referred to as the Manifest of Immigrants Act. The report was to be delivered to the collector of the district in which the ship landed.

Section 5 of the Act mandated that each district collector who received manifests must, every quarter (i.e., every three months), deposit these manifests with the Secretary of State, who in turn was required to present a summary to the United States Congress at each session. Data from such passenger manifests thus became the main basis for U.S. government immigration statistics, and subsequent migration researchers, historians and genealogists have relied on both the resulting statistical tables and the underlying manifests.

== Subsequent events ==
=== Additional Acts augmenting the Steerage Act ===
Additional Acts from 1819 to 1855, and a number of other amendments, modified the clauses of the Steerage Act. Some of the main Acts and amendments are listed below:

- An act to regulate the carriage of passengers in merchant vessels (February 22, 1847)
- An act to amend an act entitled 'An act to regulate the carriage of passengers in merchant vessels' and to determine the time when said act shall take effect (March 2, 1847)
- An act exempting vessels employed by the American Colonization Society in transporting colored emigrants from the United States to the coast of Africa from the provisions of the acts of the twenty-second February and second of March, eighteen hundred and forty-seven, regulating the carriage of passengers in merchant vessels (January 31, 1848)
- An act to provide for the ventilation of passenger vessels, and for other purposes (May 17, 1848)
- An act to extend the provisions of all laws now in force relating to the carriage of passengers in merchant vessels, and the regulation thereof (March 3, 1849)

=== Repeal and replacement by the Carriage of Passengers Act of 1855 ===
The Steerage Act of 1819, and all the other Acts regulating conditions of travel passed after that, were repealed and superseded by the Carriage of Passengers Act of 1855, passed March 3, 1855. The Carriage of Passengers Act imposed a wider range of regulations on the conditions of travel than the original Steerage Act, combining and extending regulations introduced in the many other Acts passed starting 1847. Specifically, in addition to modifying the limits based on tonnage and food and water provisions, it added many regulations on such topics as deck space, hospitals, berths, ventilators, cambooses and cooking ranges, discipline and cleanliness, and privies. The additional regulations were designed and motivated by the goal of reducing the spread of infections and deaths on board, after experience with epidemics of cholera, typhus, and typhoid in recent years (such as the 1847 North American typhus epidemic).

The Carriage of Passengers Act also contained provisions (Section 12 and 13) relating to a manifest of passengers, that corresponded to the provisions in Sections 4 and 5 of the Steerage Act. The provisions in the Carriage of Passengers Act had additional reporting requirements, such as the requirement that the manifest include "that part of the ship or vessel which the passenger had occupied during the voyage."

=== Impact on historical archives and future immigration debates ===
Section 4 of the Steerage Act led to the first set of federal records on the composition of the flow of migrants to the United States. It would be significant in the future both for governments trying to understand and regulate migration levels (and groups advising the government on it, such as the Dillingham Commission) and for individuals attempting to learn more about their ancestors' arrival in the United States.

== Similar Acts in other countries ==
The regulation of the conditions of sea transportation began in the 19th century, generally before meaningful restrictions on migration were imposed. In the United Kingdom, the first such law was the Passenger Vessels Act 1803. In addition to its stated purpose of reducing unsafe and uncomfortable journeys, the Act was suspected as a way to control emigration, by making it more expensive for people to leave for Canada, where rent was cheaper. The Act was repealed in 1826. A series of U.K. parliamentary investigations and passenger acts were undertaken in response to arduous, if not life-threatening, travel conditions on board transatlantic sailing ships during the mass migration following the late 1840s Great Famine of Ireland, though the U.K. rules were only lightly enforced, and ultimate improvements came more solidly and extensively from the introduction of much faster and more spacious iron-hulled steamships eventually offered by a half-dozen competing shipping lines operating between England and America.

The first regulation of the conditions of transportation by sea in Canada was the Immigration Act of 1869.
