= Carriage of Passengers Act of 1855 =

United States legislation

- Long title: An Act to regulate the carriage of passengers in steamships and other vessels.
- Nicknames: Passenger Act of 1855
- Enacted by: the 33rd United States Congress
- Effective: March 3, 1855

Citations
- Public law: Pub. L. 33–213
- Statutes at Large: 10 Stat. 715, Chap. 213

Legislative history
- Introduced in the House as H.R. 752 by Thomas J. D. Fuller (D–ME) on February 21, 1855; Signed into law by President Franklin Pierce on March 3, 1855

The Carriage of Passengers Act of 1855 (full name An Act further to regulate the Carriage of Passengers in Steamships and other Vessels) was an act passed by the United States federal government on March 3, 1855, replacing the previous Steerage Act of 1819 (also known as the Manifest of Immigrants Act) and a number of acts passed between 1847 and 1849 with new regulations on the conditions of sea transportation used by passenger ships landing in the United States. The law was passed by the 33rd United States Congress and signed into law by President Franklin Pierce.

== Historical context ==
=== Steerage Act of 1819 ===
On March 2, 1819, the United States government passed the first legislation regulating the conditions of sea transportation for migrants. The legislation is known as the Steerage Act of 1819 and also as the Manifest of Immigrants Act, the latter name because one of its provisions was a requirement for ships to submit a manifest of immigrants on board.

=== Disease outbreaks attributed to migrants and overcrowding of migrant ships ===
As industrialization and urbanization took hold in both the United States and Europe, new, contagious diseases such as cholera, typhus, and typhoid began to rise in prominence in both United States and Europe.

The 1829–51 cholera pandemic that originated in India and reached the United Kingdom in 1831 arrived in New York City in the United States in 1832, likely via ships carrying migrants across the Atlantic, leading to a cholera epidemic in that year. Subsequently, cholera spread to Philadelphia and Detroit.

New York City, a hub of industrialization and also a landing point for many migrants from Europe, saw further disease outbreaks: a typhoid epidemic in 1837 and a typhus epidemic in 1842. The latter epidemic killed the four-year-old son, Frank Robert, of Franklin Pierce, who would later be President of the United States when the Carriage of Passengers Act would pass.

Starting around 1845, Ireland experienced a Great Famine leading to a huge amount of emigration. The migrants, many of them on the verge of death, with no money and no food, were packed very densely into ships headed across the Atlantic Ocean to the North America. The conditions on the ships were so bad that they came to be known as coffin ships.

The Irish emigration, and in particular the cramped and unhygienic conditions of transportation, were believed to be a major factor in causing the 1847 North American typhus epidemic. The epidemic primarily affected Canada but also spread somewhat in New York City.

=== Steps leading up to passage of the Act ===
In order to prevent the spread of diseases on board, a number of pieces of legislation were passed adding new regulations to the condition of travel in a piecemeal fashion, starting 1847. Some of the main Acts and amendments are listed below:

- An act to regulate the carriage of passengers in merchant vessels (February 22, 1847)
- An act to amend an act entitled 'An act to regulate the carriage of passengers in merchant vessels' and to determine the time when said act shall take effect (March 2, 1847)
- An act exempting vessels employed by the American Colonization Society in transporting colored emigrants from the United States to the coast of Africa from the provisions of the acts of the twenty-second February and second of March, eighteen hundred and forty-seven, regulating the carriage of passengers in merchant vessels (January 31, 1848)
- An act to provide for the ventilation of passenger vessels, and for other purposes (May 17, 1848)
- An act to extend the provisions of all laws now in force relating to the carriage of passengers in merchant vessels, and the regulation thereof (March 3, 1849)

In 1853, Hamilton Fish, a Republican senator from New York, called for a select committee to "consider the causes and the extent of the sickness and mortality prevailing on board of emigrant ships" and to determine what further legislation might be necessary. With support from President Franklin Pierce, the 33rd United States Congress passed the Carriage of Passengers Act on March 3, 1855. The Act repealed and replaced the Steerage Act of 1819 as well as the five acts listed above, consolidating and expanding on the regulations in the various Acts.

== Provisions ==
=== Section 1: Density limits ===
Section 1 of the law dealt with limits to the density of passengers on the ship, as well as penalties for failing to abide by the limits. Specifically, the limits were as follows:

- Proportion of passengers to tonnage: No more than one passenger for every two tons of ship burden. Children under the age of one year were to be excluded from the computation. The previous Steerage Act of 1819 had set a limit of two passengers for every five tons of ship burden (or 1 passenger for every 2.5 tons).
- Space to be allowed: Enough space needs to be maintained to allow for passenger movement. Specifically:
  - On the main and poop decks or platforms, and in the deck houses, if any, at most one passenger for every sixteen feet of clear superficial deck.
  - On the lower deck, if any, at most one passenger for eighteen such clear superficial feet.
- Penalties: In case of a ship found to contain passengers in excess of the proportions based on tonnage and space, the master of the ship shall be found guilty of misdemeanor, and upon conviction, shall be fined fifty dollars per passenger in excess of the limits. The master may also be imprisoned for up to six months. This penalty was less than the comparable penalty in the Steerage Act of 1819, which was $150 for each passenger in excess of regulations; however, since the limitations were on the whole stricter the effective penalty could be greater.
- Lockers or inclosures allowed: If necessary for the safety and convenience of the vessel, cargo could be placed on the decks, cabins, or in other places appropriate for passenger use. Any such cargo could also be placed in lockers or enclosures prepared for the purpose, on an exterior surface impervious to the wave, capable of being cleansed in a manner similar to the decks and platform.s Under no circumstances would such space be counted in the "clear superficial feet" counted as space available to passengers for the regulations. If occupying the deck or platform, the space used for such cargo needs to be subtracted from the total space to calculate the space available to passengers.
- Hospital: One hospital may be made available in the space appropriate to passengers, but separated from the rest of the space. The space used for the hospital can be counted as part of the space available to passengers.
- Space in certain two-deck vessels: On board two-deck ships, where the height between the decks is seven and a half feet or more, fourteen clear superficial feet of deck shall be the proportion required for each passenger.

=== Section 2: Berths ===
Section 2 of the law dealt with the number of design of berths:

- No such vessel shall have more than two tier of berths.
- The interval between the lowest part and the deck or platform beneath shall not be less than nine inches.
- The berths shall be well-constructed, parallel with the sides of the vessel, at least 6 feet in length and 2 feet in width. Double berths of twice this width may be constructed to be used by two men of the same family, two women, husband and wife, a man and two of his own children under age eight, or a woman and two children under age eight.
- Violation of these rules would result in a penalty for the master of the ship of five dollars per passenger.

=== Section 3: House over passageway, hand-rail, and booby hatches ===
Section 3 of the law dealt with some miscellaneous design matters:

- House over passageway: All vessels with fifty or more passengers should have a house over the passageway for the use of passengers below deck. For vessels with 150 or more passengers, there should be two or more such houses.
- Hand-rail: The stairs to the house should have hand-rails.
- Booby hatches: Boob hatches may be substituted for such houses.

=== Section 4: Ventilators ===
- Any vessel used to carry passengers, with a legal capacity of hundred or more, must have at least two ventilators to purify the apartment or apartments occupied by passengers. At least one should be in the afterpart of the apartments, and at least one should be in the forward portion of the apartments.
- The ventilator capacity should scale in proportion to the legal capacity; for a capacity of 200, the capacity of such ventilators should be equal to a tube of twelve inches diameter in the clear.
- All ventilators must rise at least four feet six inches above the upper deck of the vessel, and be of the most approved form of construction.
- If it appears that the vessel is equally well-ventilated by other means, then the vessel shall be deemed in compliance.

=== Section 5: Camboose or cooking range ===
- Any vessel carrying more than fifty passengers must have on deck, housed and conveniently arranged, at least one camboose or cooking range.
- The dimensions must be at least four feet long and one foot six inches wide for every two hundred passengers, and shall scale with the number of passengers.
- Nothing herein shall take away the right to make arrangements for cooking between decks, if that is deemed desirable.

=== Section 6: Provisions (food) ===
- All vessels are required to have the following minimum amounts of provisions per passengers, well-secured under deck, all of good quality:
  - 20 pounds of navy bread
  - 15 pounds of rice
  - 10 pounds of wheat flour
  - 15 pounds of peas and beans
  - 20 pounds of potatoes
  - 1 pint of vinegar
  - 60 gallons of fresh water
  - 10 pounds of salted pork
  - 10 pounds of salt beef, free of bone
- The following substitutions are allowed:
  - At places where either rice, oatmeal, wheat flour, or peas and beans cannot be procured at good quality and reasonable terms, the quantity of any of the others may be used to substitute for it.
  - In case potatoes cannot be procured at reasonable terms, one pound of any of the aforementioned items can be used to substitute for five pounds of potatoes.
- The captain shall deliver to each passenger at least one-tenth of the above minimum provisions weekly, commencing on the day of sailing, and at least three quarts of water daily.
- In case of "short allowance", i.e., the required provisions not having been distributed to the passengers, the captain must pay each passenger put on short allowance a daily amount of three dollars as long as the passenger is on short allowance. The amount can be recovered in a circuit or district court of the United States.
- It is the duty of the captain or master of the ship to make sure that the provisions are served well and properly cooked, at regular and stated hours, by messes or in other ways deemed conducive to the health of passengers.
- Wilful failure to furnish and distribute properly cooked provisions makes the captain guilty of misdemeanor, and upon conviction, can lead to a fine of up to one thousand dollars and a prison term of up to one year.

=== Section 7: Discipline and cleanliness, and privies ===
- The captain must determine appropriate regulations and post them on the ship in a place accessible to all passengers prior to sailing
- The captain must make sure that all apartments occupied by passengers are kept in a clean, healthy state
- The vessel must be constructed so that the decks and all parts of every apartment can be thoroughly cleansed.
- There should be a safe, convenient privy or water-closet for the exclusive use of every one hundred passengers.
- When the weather is such that passengers cannot be mustered on deck with their bedding, the captain should have the deck cleaned with chloride of lime, or an equally efficient disinfecting agent.

=== Section 8: Penalties for violations of Sections 3, 4, 5, and 7 ===
- The captain must pay a penalty of $200 for every violation of or neglect to conform to each of Sections 3, 4, and 5.
- The captain must pay a penalty of $50 for violation of each regulation in Section 7.

=== Section 9: Inspectors of passenger vehicles ===
The collector of customs at the United States port where the ship arrives or from which the ship departs must appoint and direct one or more inspectors of customs to examine the ship. The inspector must submit a report in writing to the collector regarding the ship's compliance with the rules. If the report states compliance, this is treated as prima facie evidence of compliance.

=== Section 10: Supersedes Steamship Act of 1852 ===
Due to the overlap in score with the Steamship Act of August 13, 1852, the Act was explicitly specified as superseding that earlier Act.

=== Section 11: Vessels bound to and from Pacific ports ===
For vessels bound to and from Pacific ports, all the sections of the Act apply except Section 6 (specifying food and water provisions). However, a sufficient daily supply of water and enough well-cooked food must still be supplied by the owner and master of the vessel to all passengers, and the same penalties as in Section 6 apply for failure to meet these requirements.

=== Sections 12 and 13: Lists of passengers ===
The requirements in this section updated the requirements of Sections 4 and 5 of the Steerage Act of 1819, with significantly more reporting requirements. Upon arrival, the captain of the ship must submit, along with a manifest of the cargo (if any) or a report of the ship's arrival, a manifest of all passengers who boarded the ship at any foreign port, along with the following data for each passenger:

- Age, sex, and occupation data
- The part of the ship occupied by the passenger
- The country of citizenship and that of intended residence
- Whether the passenger died on board

Refusal or neglect to comply with any of the reporting requirements incurs the same penalties as refusal or neglect to submit a manifest at all.

The collector of customs must submit quarterly reports to the Secretary of State with all the manifests submitted in that quarter.

=== Section 14: Payments for deaths on board ===
- The captain of the ship must pay a penalty of ten dollars for every death on board (during the journey) of passengers older than eight years, with the payment due within 24 hours of landing.
- The payment must be made to a board or commission charged with taking care of sick, indigent or destitute immigrants at the port of entry. In case of multiple such boards, the Secretary of the Treasury decides who receives the penalty.

=== Section 16: Applicability to vessels carrying colored immigrants ===
Every vessel that shall or may be employed by the American Colonization Society or the Colonization Society of any state to transport from a United States port to a West African port is subject to the regulations of this Act.

=== Section 17: Collection of data by collector ===
The collector of customs at a port shall examine each ship or vessel, on its arrival at the port, and ascertain and report to the Secretary of State the following:

- The time of sailing
- The length of the voyage
- The ventilation
- The number of passengers, their space on board, their food, their native countries,
- The number of deaths, the age and sex of those who died, along with opinions on the cause of mortality, if any, on board
- If no deaths on board, the precautionary measures, arrangements and habits that helped avoid deaths.

=== Section 18: Active for ships departing after thirty days of becoming law ===
The Act would apply to all ships that depart thirty days after the Act is official.

=== Section 19: Repeal of Steerage Act and its modifications ===
The Steerage Act of 1819 (passed March 2, 1819) and the five Acts related to the conditions of passenger vessels passed since 1847 become inactive on the date the current Act becomes active. However, prosecution and recovery of damages related to these Acts for violations when they were active can continue even after their repeal.

However, the Secretary of the Treasury may, at discretion, discontinue prosecutions based on these past Acts.

== Subsequent changes and events ==
=== Court cases and interpretations ===
In 1856, the (now defunct) United States District Court for the District of California had to decide a case based on regulations in the Carriage of Passengers Act. In order to help the jury evaluate the case, the judge, Matthew Hall McAllister (who had been appointed to the post on March 2, 1855 by President Franklin Pierce), issued guidance on the law.

=== Act of July 4, 1864 ===
On July 4, 1864, under the 38th United States Congress and President Abraham Lincoln, an Act amending the Carriage of Passengers Act was passed. The Act was titled An Act further to regulate the Carriage of Passengers in Steamships and other Vessels. It primarily dealt with the applicability of provisions of the Carriage of Passengers Act to ships arriving in Mexico and Central America. It also specified that informers about violations of the Act were entitled to half the penalties.

=== Carriage of Passengers Act of 1882 ===
On August 2, 1882, a further Carriage of Passengers Act was passed, updating the regulations in light of recent advanced in shipbuilding that made better conditions of travel more economically feasible. There continued to be pressure from American medical bodies, such as the American Medical Association, to strengthen the regulations on the conditions of travel.

== See also ==
Immigration Act of 1882
Immigration Act of 1891
