= History of immigration and nationality law in the United States =

During the 18th and most of the 19th centuries, the United States had limited regulation of immigration and naturalization at a national level. Under a mostly prevailing "open border" policy, immigration was generally welcomed, although citizenship was limited to "white persons" as of 1790, and naturalization was subject to five-year residency requirement as of 1802. Passports and visas were not required for entry into America; rules and procedures for arriving immigrants were determined by local ports of entry or state laws. Processes for naturalization were determined by local county courts.

In the course of the late 1800s and early 1900s, many policies regarding immigration and naturalization were shifted in stages to a national level through court rulings giving primacy to federal authority over immigration policy, and the Immigration Act of 1891. The Immigration Act of 1891 led to the establishment of the U.S. Bureau of Immigration and the opening of the Ellis Island inspection station in 1892. Constitutional authority (Article 1 §8) was later relied upon to enact the Naturalization Act of 1906 which standardized procedures for naturalization nationwide, and created the Bureau of Naturalization (initially joined with the Bureau of Immigration; later from 1933 to 2003, both functions were part of the Immigration and Naturalization Service).

After 2003, the Immigration and Naturalization Service split into separate agencies under the then newly created Department of Homeland Security: naturalization services and functions have been handled by U.S. Citizenship and Immigration Services (USCIS), while immigration services and regulations have been divided between administrative (in USCIS), enforcement (in Immigration and Customs Enforcement), and border inspections (under U.S. Customs and Border Protection).

== 18th century ==
The United States Constitution was adopted on September 17, 1787. Article I, section 8, clause 4 of the Constitution expressly gives the United States Congress the power to establish a uniform rule of naturalization.

Pursuant to this power, Congress in 1790 passed the first naturalization law for the United States, the Naturalization Act of 1790. The law enabled those who had resided in the country for two years and had kept their current state of residence for a year to apply for citizenship. However, it restricted naturalization to "free white persons" of "good character". Oddly, the law authorized any "court of record" to perform naturalization. In other words, for over 110 years, any federal or state court of record could naturalize a qualified applicant.

The Naturalization Act of 1795 increased the residency requirement to five years residence and added a requirement to give a three years notice of intention to apply for citizenship and the Naturalization Act of 1798 further increased the residency requirement to 14 years and required five years notice of intent to apply for citizenship.

The Alien and Sedition Acts were passed by the 5th U.S. Congress and signed into law by President John Adams in June and July 1798. They developed within the context of overlaps between America's first major political party rivalry, the early international convulsions of what soon became the Napoleonic wars, and challenges of reconciling press freedom with domestic tranquility. Three of the four acts were temporary, rarely used and/or soon repealed. By 1802 only one of the four, the Alien Enemies Act remained. It was most extensively used after Japan and Germany declared war on the United States in December 1941, and never since then, until 2025.

== 19th century ==
The Naturalization Law of 1802 repealed and replaced the Naturalization Act of 1798. The residency requirement changed back to five years.

The Steerage Act of 1819 was the first law in the United States regulating the conditions of transportation used by people arriving and departing by sea. It set a limit of two passengers for every five tons of ship burden and required ship captains or masters to report a list of all passengers disembarking in America. This law was a regulatory cornerstone of what became the most extensive, long-lasting, and linguistically diverse mass transoceanic migration, represented a small early stepping stone towards local coordination with national immigration policy, and laid the basis for historical statistical documentation of how America has for centuries imported new Americans.

The Supreme Court's Dred Scott v. Sandford 1857 decision "ruled that people of African descent 'are not included, and were not intended to be included, under the word 'citizens' in the Constitution.' " This decision complicated the issue of citizenship, reinforced racial divisions, and deepened the north–south schism which led to the U.S. Civil War, but was eventually effectively nullified by the passage of the 13th and 14th Amendments.

The Fourteenth Amendment, based on the Civil Rights Act of 1866, was ratified in 1868 to provide citizenship for former slaves. The 1866 Act read, "That all persons born in the United States and not subject to any foreign power, excluding Indians not taxed, are hereby declared to be citizens of the United States; and such citizens, of every race and color, without regard to any previous condition of slavery or involuntary servitude" shall have the same rights "as is enjoyed by white and other black citizens." The phrase in the Fourteenth Amendment reversed the conditional clause to read: "All persons born or naturalized in the United States, and subject to the jurisdiction thereof, are citizens of the United States and of the State wherein they reside." This was applied by the Supreme Court in the 1898 case United States v. Wong Kim Ark to deal with the child of Chinese citizens who were legally resident in the U.S. at the time of his birth, with exceptions such as for the children of diplomats and American Indians. See the articles jus soli (birthplace) and jus sanguinis (bloodline) for further discussion.

In 1870, the law was broadened to allow African Americans to be naturalized. Asian immigrants were excluded from naturalization but not from living in the United States. There were also significant restrictions on some Asians at the state level; in California, for example, non-citizen Asians were not allowed to own land.

The first federal statute restricting immigration was the Page Act, passed in 1875. It barred immigrants considered "undesirable," defining this as a person from East Asia who was coming to the United States to be a forced laborer, any East Asian woman who would engage in prostitution, and all people considered to be convicts in their own country. In practice, it resulted mainly in barring entry to Chinese women.

After the immigration of 123,000 Chinese in the 1870s, who joined the 105,000 who had immigrated between 1850 and 1870, Congress passed the Chinese Exclusion Act in 1882 which limited further Chinese immigration. Chinese had immigrated to the Western United States as a result of unsettled conditions in China, the availability of jobs working on railroads, and the Gold Rush that was going on at that time in California. The expression "Yellow Peril" became popular at this time.

The act excluded Chinese laborers from immigrating to the United States for ten years. Laborers in the United States and laborers with work visas received a certificate of residency and were allowed to travel in and out of the United States. Amendments made in 1884 tightened the provisions that allowed previous immigrants to leave and return, and clarified that the law applied to ethnic Chinese regardless of their country of origin. The act was renewed in 1892 by the Geary Act for another ten years, and in 1902 with no terminal date. It was repealed in 1943, although large scale Chinese immigration did not occur until 1965.

From August 1882, a federal "head tax" of 50¢ was collected from shipping companies landing non-US citizens. The tax was raised to $1 in October 1894, to $2 in March 1903, to $4 effective June, 1907, and to $8 in 1917.

In 1882, and again 1908, the steerage legislation of 1847 and 1885 was revised and updated.

In 1885, the Alien Contract Labor Law was passed by the U.S. Congress.

In 1891, assuming federal control of immigration regulation from states, the Federal Bureau of Immigration was established. In 1892, the federal immigration inspection station at Ellis Island was opened. It burned down in 1897 and reopened in December 1900. Also in 1891, immigrants with contagious disease disbarred from entry, were to be returned at shipping company expense. (In addition, as of 1903, companies landing immigrants with detectable diseases were to be fined $100 for each such exclusion), and passengers lists were to include a column for "race" (essentially defined as native language); the Bureau of Immigration actually started the race classification already in 1899.

== 20th century ==
By the turn of the century, it had become clear that allowing state courts to perform naturalization had resulted in wildly diverse and non-uniform naturalization procedures across the United States. Every court imposed its own specific procedures and fees, and issued its own unique certificates. The Naturalization Act of 1906 created the Bureau of Immigration and Naturalization to maintain centralized records of naturalization and to impose uniform nationwide procedures, forms, and certificates. After 1906, compliance with the bureau's procedures was necessary before a court could naturalize a person. Although the statutory language authorizing any "court of record" to naturalize still remained in effect, the new federal bureau moved away from state-level naturalization and certified eligibility for naturalization only to the federal courts.

The Empire of Japan's State Department negotiated the so-called Gentlemen's Agreement in 1907, a protocol where Japan agreed to stop issuing passports to its citizens who wanted to emigrate to the United States. In practice, the Japanese government compromised with its prospective emigrants and continued to give passports to the Territory of Hawaii where many Japanese resided. Once in Hawaii, it was easy for the Japanese to continue on to Japanese settlements on the west coast if they so desired. In the decade of 1901 to 1910, 129,000 Japanese immigrated to the continental United States or Hawaii; nearly all were males and on five-year work contracts and 117,000 more came in the decades from 1911 to 1930. How many of them stayed and how many returned at the end of their contracts is unknown but it is estimated that about one-half returned. Again this immigrant flow was at least 80% male and the demand for female Japanese immigrants almost immediately arose. This need was met in part by what are called "postcard wives" who immigrated to new husbands who had chosen them on the basis of their pictures (similar marriages also occurred in nearly all cultures throughout the female-scarce west). The Japanese government finally quit issuing passports to the Territory of Hawaii for single women in the 1920s.

Congress also banned persons because of poor health or lack of education. An 1882 law banned entry of "lunatics" and infectious disease carriers. This law was called The General Admission Act. This act prohibited the entry of people referred to as idiots, lunatics, and convicts. After President William McKinley was assassinated by an anarchist of immigrant parentage, Congress enacted the Anarchist Exclusion Act in 1903 to exclude known anarchist agitators.

A literacy requirement was added in the Immigration Act of 1917. Literacy test bills had passed the U.S. Congress in 1897, 1913 and 1915 but had been vetoed each time by the presidents (Cleveland, Taft and Wilson). Wilson also vetoed the 1917 bill, but on that occasion, Congress overrode the veto by the required two thirds margin.

=== 1920s ===
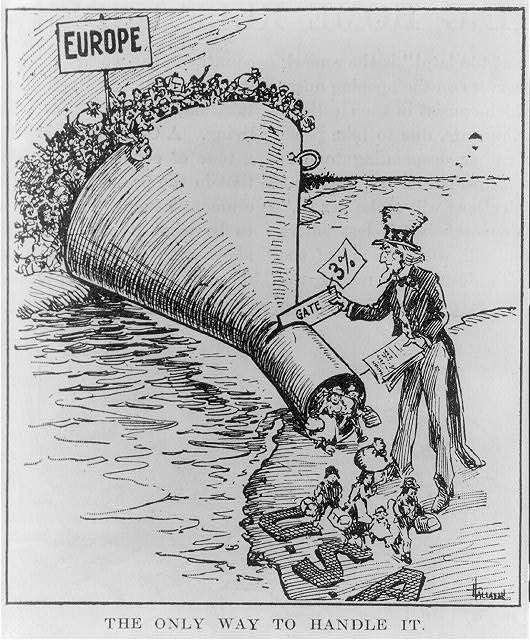
Political cartoon from 1921

In 1921, the United States Congress passed the Emergency Quota Act, which established national immigration quotas limiting immigration from the Eastern Hemisphere. The quota for each country was derived by calculating 3 percent of the number of foreign-born residents of each nationality who were living in the United States as of the 1910 census.

The crucial 1923 Supreme Court case United States v. Bhagat Singh Thind created the official stance to classify South Asian Indians as non-white, which at the time allowed Indians who had already been naturalized to be retroactively stripped of their citizenship after prosecutors argued that they had gained their citizenship illegally. The California Alien Land Law of 1913 (overturned in 1952 by the holding in Sei Fujii v. California, 38 Cal. 2d 718) and other similar laws prohibited aliens from owning land property, thus effectively stripping Indian Americans of land rights. The decision placated Asiatic Exclusion League demands and growing outrage at the so-called "Hindoo Invasion" and "Yellow Peril". While more recent legislation influenced by the civil rights movement has removed much of the statutory discrimination against Asians, no case has overturned the classification of Indians as non-white.

The 1921 quota system was extended temporarily by a more restrictive formula assigning quotas based on 2 percent of the number of foreign-born in the 1890 census while a more complex quota plan, the National Origins Formula, was computed to replace this "emergency" system under the provisions of the Immigration Act of 1924 (Johnson-Reed Act).

The 1924 Act set national quotas as a fraction of 150,000 in proportion to the national origins of the entire White American population as of the 1920 census, except those having origins in the non-quota countries of the Western Hemisphere (which remained unrestricted).

A 1929 Act added provisions for prior deportees, who, 60 days after the act took effect, would be convicted of a felony whether their deportation occurred before or after the law was enacted. The Sabath Act (45 Stat 1545, 4 March 1929, ch 683, Public Law 1101, H. R. 16440, 70th Congress) made provision in relation to declarations of intention in naturalization proceedings.

=== 1930s–1950s ===
In 1932, President Hoover and the State Department essentially shut down immigration during the Great Depression as immigration went from 236,000 in 1929 to 23,000 in 1933. This was accompanied by voluntary repatriation to Europe and Mexico, and coerced repatriation and deportation of between 500,000 and 2 million Mexican Americans, mostly citizens, in the Mexican Repatriation. Total immigration in the decade of 1931 to 1940 was 528,000, averaging less than 53,000 a year.

The Chinese exclusion laws were repealed in 1943. The Luce–Celler Act of 1946 ended discrimination against Filipino Americans and Indian Americans, who were accorded the right to naturalization, and allowed a quota of 100 immigrants per year.

The Immigration and Nationality Act of 1952 (the McCarran–Walter Act) revised the National Origins Formula, again allotting quotas in proportion to the national origins of the population as of the 1920 census, but by a simplified calculation taking a flat one-sixth of 1 percent of the number of inhabitants of each nationality then residing in the U.S. For the first time in American history, racial distinctions were omitted from the U.S. Code. The 1952 Act established a simple 4-class preference system within quotas, reserving first preference for immigrants of special skills or abilities needed in the U.S. workforce, and allotting the second, third, and fourth preferences to relatives of U.S. citizens and resident aliens.

=== 1960s ===
The Immigration and Nationality Act Amendments of 1965 (the Hart–Celler Act) abolished the system of national-origin quotas. There was, for the first time, a limitation on Western Hemisphere immigration (120,000 per year), with the Eastern Hemisphere limited to 170,000. The law changed the preference system for immigrants. Specifically, the law expanded the number of preference classes from 4 to 7, and assigned the first, second, fourth, and fifth preference classes to relatives, relegating immigrants with occupational skills needed in the U.S. workforce to the third and sixth preference classes, and creating a new seventh class of conditional entries for refugees and asylum seekers. Family reunification became the cornerstone of the bill. At the time, the then-chairman of the Senate Immigration Subcommittee Edward Kennedy remarked that "the bill will not flood our cities with immigrants. It will not upset the ethnic mix of our society. It will not relax the standards of admission. It will not cause American workers to lose their jobs." (U.S. Senate, Subcommittee on Immigration and Naturalization of the Committee on the Judiciary, Washington, D.C., Feb. 10, 1965. pp. 1–3.)

=== 1980s ===
The Refugee Act of 1980 established policies for refugees, redefining "refugee" according to United Nations norms. A target for refugees was set at 50,000 and the worldwide ceiling for immigrants was reduced to 270,000 annually.

In 1986, the Immigration Reform and Control Act (IRCA) was passed, creating for the first time penalties for employers who knowingly hired undocumented immigrants. IRCA also contained an amnesty for about 3 million undocumented immigrants already in the United States, and mandated the intensification of some of the activities of the United States Border Patrol and the Immigration and Naturalization Service (now part of Department of Homeland Security).

=== 1990s ===
The U.S. Commission on Immigration Reform, led by former Rep. Barbara Jordan, ran from 1990 to 1997. The Commission covered many facets of immigration policy, but started from the perception that the "credibility of immigration policy can be measured by a simple yardstick: people who should get in, do get in; people who should not get in, are kept out; and people who are judged deportable are required to leave". From there, in a series of four reports, the commission looked at all aspects of immigration policy. In the first, it found that enforcement was lax and needed improvement on the border and internally. For internal enforcement, it recommended that an automated employment verification system be created to enable employers to distinguish between legal and illegal workers. The second report discussed legal immigration issues and suggested that immediate family members and skilled workers receive priority. The third report covered refugee and asylum issues. Finally, the fourth report reiterated the major points of the previous reports and the need for a new immigration policy. Few of these suggestions were implemented.

The Immigration Act of 1990 (IMMACT) modified and expanded the 1965 act; it significantly increased the total immigration limit to 700,000 and increased visas by 40 percent. Family reunification was retained as the main immigration criterion, with significant increases in employment-related immigration.

The Immigration Act of 1990 also changed who was responsible for actually naturalizing people. By the 1980s, naturalization had become rather perfunctory from the perspective of the federal judiciary. The Immigration and Naturalization Service did all the real work, then certified to the courts which applicants were now eligible for naturalization, and then the courts signed off on what were actually INS decisions. Effective October 1, 1991, the authority to naturalize people was transferred from courts to the United States Attorney General, who in turn delegated such authority to the Commissioner of the Immigration and Naturalization Service. However, one legacy of having naturalization performed by courts for 200 years is that naturalization ceremonies are often still performed at federal courthouses.

Several pieces of legislation signed into law in 1996 marked a turn towards harsher policies for both legal and illegal immigrants. The Antiterrorism and Effective Death Penalty Act (AEDPA) and Illegal Immigration Reform and Immigrant Responsibility Act (IIRIRA) vastly increased the categories of criminal activity for which immigrants, including green card holders, can be deported and imposed mandatory detention for certain types of deportation cases. As a result, well over 2 million individuals have been deported since 1996.

== 21st century ==
The terrorist attacks on September 11, 2001 affected American perspectives on many issues, including immigration. A total of 20 foreign terrorists were involved, 19 of whom took part in the attacks that caused the deaths of 2,977 victims, most of them civilians. The terrorists had entered the United States on tourist or student visas. Four of them, however, had violated the terms of their visas. The attack exposed long-standing weaknesses in the U.S. immigration system that included failures in the areas of visa processing, internal enforcement, and information sharing.

The REAL ID Act of 2005 changed some visa limits, tightened restrictions on asylum applications and made it easier to exclude suspected terrorists, and removed restrictions on building border fences.

In 2005, Senators John McCain and Ted Kennedy revived the discussion of comprehensive immigration reform with the proposal of the Secure America and Orderly Immigration Act, incorporating legalization, guest worker programs, and enhanced border security. The bill was never voted on in the Senate, but portions are incorporated in later Senate proposals.

In 2006, the House of Representatives and the Senate produced their own, conflicting bills. In December 2005, the House passed the Border Protection, Anti-terrorism, and Illegal Immigration Control Act of 2005, which was sponsored by Rep. James Sensenbrenner (R-WI). The act was limited to enforcement and focused on both the border and the interior. In the Senate, the Comprehensive Immigration Reform Act of 2006 (CIRA) was sponsored by Sen. Arlen Specter (R-PA) and passed in May 2006. CIRA would have given a path to eventual citizenship to a majority of undocumented immigrants already in the country as well as dramatically increased legal immigration. Although the bills passed their respective chambers, no compromise bill emerged.

In 2007, the Comprehensive Immigration Reform Act of 2007 was discussed in the Senate, which would have given a path to eventual citizenship to a large majority of illegal entrants in the country, significantly increased legal immigration and increased enforcement. The bill failed to pass a cloture vote, essentially killing it.

Individual components of various reform packages have been separately introduced and pursued in the Congress. The Dream Act is a bill initially introduced in 2001, incorporated in the various comprehensive reform bills, and then separately reintroduced in 2009 and 2010. The bill would provide legal residency and a path to citizenship for undocumented immigrants who graduate from U.S. high schools and attend college or join the military.

Immigrant visa limits set by Congress remain at 700,000 for the combined categories of employment, family preference, and family immediate. There are additional provisions for diversity and a small number of special visas. In 2008 immigration in these categories totaled slightly less than 750,000 and similar totals (representing maximums allowed by Congress) have been tallied in recent years.

Naturalization numbers have ranged from about 500,000 to just over 1,000,000 per year since the early 1990s, with peak years in 1996 and 2008 each around 1,040,000. These numbers add up to more than the number of visas issued in those years because as many as 2.7 million of those who were granted amnesty by IRCA in 1986 have converted or will convert to citizenship. In general, immigrants become eligible for citizenship after five years of residence. Many do not immediately apply, or do not pass the test on the first attempt. This means that the counts for visas and the counts for naturalization will always remain out of step, though in the long run the naturalizations add up to somewhat less than the visas.

These numbers are separate from illegal immigration, which peaked at probably over 1 million per year around the year 2000 and has probably declined to about 500,000 per year by 2009, which seems comparable or perhaps less than the outflow returning to their native countries. Some of the legal immigrant categories may include former illegal immigrants who have come current on legal applications and passed background checks; these individuals are included in the count of legal visas, not as a separate or additional number.

For Mexico and the Philippines, the only categories of immigrant visa available in practice are those for immediate dependent family of U.S. citizens. Persons who applied since 1994 have not been in the categories for adult children and siblings, and trends show that these data are unlikely to change. In fact, the trend has recently been moving in the opposite direction. Immigrant work visas run about 6 to 8 years behind current. While the government does not publish data on the number of pending applications, the evidence is that the backlog in those categories dwarfs the yearly quotas.

Legal immigration visas should not be confused with temporary work permits. Permits for seasonal labor (about 285,000 in 2008) or students (about 917,000 in 2008) generally do not permit conversion to immigrant status. Even those who are legally authorized to work temporarily in the United States (such as H1-B workers) must apply for permanent residence separately, and gain no advantage from their temporary employment authorization. This is unlike many other countries, whose laws provide for permanent residence after a certain number of years of legal employment. Temporary workers, therefore, do not form a distinctly counted source of immigration.

In March 2020, the current President Trumps administration launched the Title 42 Immigration Act. This act was launched by the administration which allowed U.S. authorities to push out migrants back to Mexico, or their country of origin. This act was seen as one of the toughest measures implemented on the U.S. border. The act was launched as a way to promote public health during the COVID-19 Pandemic.

With a change in Presidency, The Title 42 Immigration Act was being pushed to be terminated by the Biden administration. This originally failed as the members of congress were worried that lifting the Act would create a surge in migration. While there was pushback, the Act did eventually terminate on May 11, 2023, when the public health emergency was lifted.

President Biden had a share of impactful acts during his presidency. In 2021, the U.S. Citizenship Act was introduced to the house by the Biden administration. This act was set in place to create a path for citizenship for certain undocumented individuals. The bill also replaces the term alien with noncitizen in the immigration statutes and addresses other related issues. This Act ultimately did not make it through congress and died with the ending of that Congress year.

=== Support Our Law Enforcement and Safe Neighborhoods Act 2010 (Arizona SB 1070) ===
Under Arizona SB 1070, passed in 2010, it is a state misdemeanor for immigrants not to carry their immigration documents on their person while in Arizona, and people who are stopped or arrested by state police for any reason may be subject to verification of their immigration status. Arizona state or local officials and agencies cannot restrict enforcement of federal immigration laws. Anyone sheltering, hiring or transporting an undocumented immigrant is subject to penalty. Some provisions of this law have been found to be unconstitutional by the United States Supreme Court.

=== Border Security, Economic Opportunity, and Immigration Modernization Act 2013 (S.744) ===
On April 17, 2013, the "Gang of Eight" in the United States Senate introduced S.744, the long-awaited Senate version of the immigration reform bill proposed in Congress. Text of the proposed legislation was promptly released on the website of Senator Charles Schumer. On June 27, 2013, the Senate passed the bill on 68–32 margin. The bill was not voted on by the United States House of Representatives and did not become a law.

=== Executive actions ===
On November 21, 2014, president Barack Obama signed two executive actions which had the effect of delaying deportation for millions of illegal immigrants. The orders apply to parents of United States citizens (Deferred Action for Parents of Americans) and young people brought into the country illegally (Deferred Action for Childhood Arrivals).

For continued executive action, see Immigration policy of Donald Trump.

== See also ==
- Immigration lawyer
- Demography and Immigration
- List of United States immigration laws
- United States nationality law
- Alien and Sedition Acts
- Eugenics in the United States
- History of immigration to the United States
- Immigration Restriction League
- Immigration and Naturalization Service
- Illegal immigration to the United States
- Immigration detention
- Asylum in the United States
- Immigration reform in the United States
- Racism in the United States
- Judicial aspects of race in the United States
- Republicans for Immigration Reform
- Global workforce
