= Naturalization Act =

Naturalization Act may refer to:

== Great Britain ==
- Naturalization Act 1714
- Jewish Naturalisation Act 1753
- Naturalization Act 1870

== United States ==
- Naturalization Act of 1790
- Naturalization Act of 1795
- Naturalization Act of 1798, part of the Alien and Sedition Acts
- Naturalization Acts of 1804 and 1855, concerning birthright citizenship in the United States
- Naturalization Act of 1870
- Naturalization Act of 1906

== See also ==
- Naturalization Law of 1802
