= Natural-born-citizen clause (United States) =

Clause of the US Constitution specifying natural born US citizenship to run for President

Status as a natural-born citizen of the United States is one of the eligibility requirements established in the United States Constitution for holding the office of president or vice president. This requirement was intended to protect the nation from foreign influence.

The U.S. Constitution uses but does not define the phrase "natural born Citizen" and various opinions have been offered over time regarding its exact meaning. The consensus of early 21st-century constitutional and legal scholars, together with relevant case law, is that natural-born citizens include, subject to exceptions, those born in the United States. As to those born elsewhere who meet the legal requirements for birthright citizenship, the consensus emerging as of 2016 was that they also are natural-born citizens.

The first nine presidents and the 12th president, Zachary Taylor, were all citizens at the adoption of the constitution in 1789, with all being born within the territory held by the United States and recognized in the Treaty of Paris. All presidents who have served since were born in the United States. Of the 45 (Note: As of 2025. While there have been 47 presidencies, only 45 individuals have served as president. Two presidents have served non-consecutive terms: and thus, Grover Cleveland is numbered as both the 22nd and 24th U.S. president, and Donald Trump is numbered as both the 45th and 47th U.S. president.) individuals who became president, there have been eight that had at least one parent who was not born in the United States.

The natural-born-citizen clause has been mentioned in passing in several decisions of the United States Supreme Court, and by some lower courts that have addressed eligibility challenges, but the Supreme Court has never directly addressed the question of a specific presidential or vice-presidential candidate's eligibility as a natural-born citizen. Many eligibility lawsuits from the 2008, 2012, and 2016 election cycles were dismissed in lower courts due to the challengers' difficulty in showing that they had standing to raise legal objections. Additionally, some experts have suggested that the precise meaning of the natural-born-citizen clause may never be decided by the courts because, in the end, presidential eligibility may be determined to be a non-justiciable political question that can be decided only by Congress rather than by the judicial branch of government.

== Constitutional provisions ==
Part of the constitutional provision as it appeared in 1787

Article Two, Section 1 of the United States Constitution sets forth the eligibility requirements for serving as president of the United States, under clause 5 (emphasis added):

No Person except a natural born Citizen, or a Citizen of the United States, at the time of the Adoption of this Constitution, shall be eligible to the Office of President; neither shall any Person be eligible to that Office who shall not have attained to the Age of thirty-five Years, and been fourteen Years a Resident within the United States.

Under the original Constitution, members of the Electoral College cast two votes for president, with the runner-up elected vice president. The Twelfth Amendment requires the vice president is to be elected separately, and concludes with the clause, "No person constitutionally ineligible to the office of President shall be eligible to that of Vice-President of the United States."

The Fourteenth Amendment does not address the issue of presidential eligibility or use the phrase natural-born citizen. It states, "All persons born or naturalized in the United States, and subject to the jurisdiction thereof, are citizens of the United States and of the State wherein they reside."

Under Article One, representatives and senators are required to be U.S. citizens, but there is no requirement that they be natural born, in contrast to the presidential requirement.

== History ==
=== Antecedents in Britain ===
The use of the term "natural born" was not without precedent. An early recorded example was in Calvin's Case (1608), which ruled that a person born in any place subject to the King of England (which at the time included Scotland and Ireland as separate kingdoms, and formerly many parts of France) was a natural born subject of England and therefore entitled to bring a civil suit in an English court. Statutes in Britain prior to American independence used the phrase "natural born subject". For example, clause III of the Foreign Protestants Naturalization Act 1708 provided:

That the Children of all natural born Subjects born out of the Ligeance of Her Majesty Her Heires and Successors shall be deemed adjudged and taken to be natural born Subjects of this Kingdom to all Intents Constructions and Purposes whatsoever

The Act was repealed (except for the quoted clause III regarding foreign-born children) by the Tories in 1711 by the statute 10 Anne c. 5.

Subsequently, the British Nationality Act 1730 provided:

for the explaining the said recited Clause in the said Act . . . [t]hat all Children born out of the Ligeance of the Crown of England, or of Great Britain, or which shall hereafter be born out of such Ligeance, whose Fathers were or shall be natural-born Subjects of the Crown of England, or of Great Britain, at the Time of the Birth of such Children respectively ... are hereby declared to be natural-born Subjects of the Crown of Great Britain, to all Intents, Constructions and Purposes whatsoever.

Another use is in the Plantation Act 1740:

[A]ll persons born out of the legience of His Majesty, His Heirs, or Successors, who have ... or shall inhabit or reside for ... seven years or more in any of His Majesty's colonies in America ... shall be deemed, adjudged, and taken to be His Majesty's natural-born subjects of this Kingdom.

Jurist William Blackstone wrote in 1765 that "Natural-born subjects are such as are born within the dominions of the crown of England". Blackstone added that offspring who are not inhabitants may also be natural born subjects:

But by several more modern statutes ... all children, born out of the king's ligeance, whose fathers were natural-born subjects, are now natural-born subjects themselves, to all intents and purposes, without any exception; unless their said fathers were attainted, or banished beyond sea, for high treason; or were then in the service of a prince at enmity with Great Britain.

In 1775, however, Blackstone reversed his opinion and explained that the children "are now deemed to be natural-born subjects" rather than "are now natural-born subjects."

Similarly, Francis Plowden initially explained that an early English statute made foreign-born children of English parents "in fact and law . . . true native subjects" and that the eighteenth-century British statutes made persons natural-born subjects by statute law just as others were natural-born subjects by the common law. However, after further consideration he also reversed his opinion and concluded in 1785 that the statutes did not make the children natural born subjects—rather, there remained a "relict of alienage in them."

Prior to Blackstone, Edward Coke offered a narrower opinion in Calvin's Case. According to Coke: "[I]f any of the King's Ambassadors in foreign nations, have children there of their wives, being English women, by the common laws of England they are natural-born subjects, and yet they are born out of the King's dominions."

The term "natural born" has often been used synonymously with "native born". The English lexicographer Samuel Johnson wrote in 1756 that the word "natural" means "native," and that the word "native" may mean either an "inhabitant" or an "offspring".

=== Between 1776 and 1789 ===
From the Declaration of Independence (1776) to the ratification of the Constitution (1789), the thirteen states were independent of Britain, and during much of this time the Articles of Confederation tied together the country. The phrase "natural born citizen" was sometimes used during this period. An example occurred in 1784 when the Maryland General Assembly conferred citizenship on the (French-born) Marquis de Lafayette:

Be it enacted by the General Assembly of Maryland—that the Marquis de laFayette and his Heirs male forever shall be and they and each of them are hereby deemed adjudged and taken to be natural born Citizens of this State and shall henceforth be entitled to all the Immunities, Rights and Privileges of natural born Citizens thereof ...

=== Constitutional Convention ===
The Constitution does not explain the meaning of "natural born". On June 18, 1787, Alexander Hamilton submitted to the Convention a sketch of a plan of government. The sketch provided for an executive "Governour" but had no eligibility requirements. At the close of the Convention, Hamilton conveyed a paper to James Madison which he said delineated the Constitution that he wished had been proposed by the Convention; he had stated its principles during the deliberations. Max Farrand wrote that it "was not submitted to the Convention and has no further value than attaches to the personal opinions of Hamilton." Article IX, section 1 of Hamilton's draft constitution provided: "No person shall be eligible to the office of President of the United States unless he be now a Citizen of one of the States, or hereafter be born a Citizen of the United States."

On July 25, 1787, John Jay wrote to George Washington, presiding officer of the Convention:

Permit me to hint, whether it would not be wise and seasonable to provide a strong check to the admission of Foreigners into the administration of our national Government, and to declare expressly that the Command in chief of the American army shall not be given to, nor devolve on, any but a natural born Citizen.

While the Committee of Detail originally proposed that the President must be merely a citizen, as well as a resident for 21 years, the Committee of Eleven changed "citizen" to "natural born citizen", and the residency requirement to 14 years, without recorded explanation after receiving Jay's letter. The Convention accepted the change without further recorded debate.

=== Constitutionality of the natural-born-citizen clause ===
In 2012, Abdul Karim Hassan filed several unsuccessful lawsuits that claimed the Equal Protection Clause of the Fourteenth Amendment had superseded the natural-born-citizen clause; he had argued natural-born citizenship was a form of discrimination based on national origin.

Cenk Uygur, a naturalized U.S. citizen seeking participation in the 2024 Democratic Party presidential primaries, was excluded from states' ballots after making arguments similar to Hassan's. Shiva Ayyadurai, also a naturalized U.S. citizen seeking to participate in the 2024 United States presidential election, also made these arguments and was excluded.

=== Proposed constitutional amendments ===
More than two dozen proposed constitutional amendments have been introduced in Congress to relax the restriction. Two of the more well known were introduced by Representative Jonathan Brewster Bingham in 1974, with the intent to allow German-born Secretary of State Henry Kissinger (otherwise fourth in the line of succession) to become eligible, and the Equal Opportunity to Govern Amendment by Senator Orrin Hatch in 2003, intending to allow eligibility for Austrian-born Arnold Schwarzenegger. The Bingham amendment would have also made clear the eligibility of those born abroad to U.S. parents, while the Hatch one would have allowed those who have been naturalized citizens for twenty years to be eligible.

== Rationale ==
St. George Tucker, an early federal judge, wrote in his 1803 edition of William Blackstone's Commentaries on the Laws of England, perhaps the leading authority for the delegates to the Constitutional Convention for the terms used in the Constitution, that the natural-born-citizen clause is "a happy means of security against foreign influence" and that "[t]he admission of foreigners into our councils, consequently, cannot be too much guarded against." In a footnote, Tucker wrote that naturalized citizens have the same rights as the natural-born except "they are forever incapable of being chosen to the office of president of the United States."

In a speech before the Senate, delegate Charles Cotesworth Pinckney gave the rationale, "to insure experience and attachment to the country."

Professor Akhil Amar of Yale Law School claimed that there had been a concern on the part of those drafting the U.S. Constitution that a member of the European aristocracy might immigrate and attempt to buy his way into power and that it made sense in this light to include a provision in the Constitution that would exclude immigrants from the presidency.

A popular myth about the clause suggests that one of the reasons it was written was to disqualify Alexander Hamilton, who was born in the British West Indies, from assuming the office of president. Hamilton was, however, eligible for the presidency, as the clause exempted those who had been citizens prior to the Constitution's adoption from its "natural-born" requirement, and he had been made a citizen through the New York State Legislature in 1782.

== Interpretations of the clause ==
=== Naturalization Acts of 1790 and 1795 ===
Because of the large number of Framers who went on to serve in Congress, laws passed by the early sessions of Congress have often been looked to as evidence of the Framers' intent. The Naturalization Act of 1790 provided that "the children of citizens of the United States, that may be born beyond sea, or out of the limits of the United States, shall be considered as natural born citizens...". The 1790 Act is the only act that has ever used the term, which was omitted by the replacement Naturalization Act of 1795. The 1795 Act merely declared that such children "shall be considered as citizens of the United States".

=== Interpretations by the courts ===
==== 1800s ====
Although eligibility for the Presidency was not an issue in any 19th-century litigation, there have been a few cases that shed light on the definitions of natural born and native born citizen. The leading case, Lynch v. Clarke (Note: NY Chanc.Ct., November 5, 1844; 1 Sandf.Ch. 583, 3 NY Leg.Obs. 236, 7 NY Ch. Ann. 443, 1844 WL 4808, 1844 N.Y.Misc. LEXIS 1.) of 1844, indicated that citizens born "within the dominions and allegiance of the United States" are citizens regardless of parental citizenship. This case dealt with a New York law (similar to laws of other states at that time) that only a U.S. citizen could inherit real estate. The plaintiff, Julia Lynch, had been born in New York while her parents, both British, were briefly visiting the U.S., and shortly thereafter all three left for Britain and never returned to the U.S. The New York Chancery Court determined that, under common law and prevailing statutes, she was a U.S. citizen by birth and nothing had deprived her of that citizenship, notwithstanding that both her parents were not U.S. citizens or that British law might also claim her through her parents' nationality. In the course of the decision, the court cited the Constitutional provision and said:

Suppose a person should be elected president who was native born, but of alien parents; could there be any reasonable doubt that he was eligible under the Constitution? I think not. The position would be decisive in his favor, that by the rule of the common law, in force when the Constitution was adopted, he is a citizen.

And further:

Upon principle, therefore, I can entertain no doubt, but that by the law of the United States, every person born within the dominions and allegiance of the United States, whatever the situation of his parents, is a natural born citizen. It is surprising that there has been no judicial decision upon this question.

The decision in Lynch was cited as persuasive or authoritative precedent in numerous subsequent cases, and reinforced the interpretation that "natural born citizen" meant born "within the dominions and allegiance of the United States" regardless of parental citizenship. For example, in an 1884 case, In re Look Tin Singg, the federal court held, that despite laws preventing naturalization of Chinese visitors, Chinese persons born in the United States were citizens by birth, and remained such despite any long stay in China. Citing Lynch, Justice Stephen J. Field wrote:

After an exhaustive examination of the law, the Vice-Chancellor said that he entertained no doubt that every person born within the dominions and allegiance of the United States, whatever the situation of his parents, was a natural-born citizen, and added that this was the general understanding of the legal profession, and the universal impression of the public mind.

Supreme Court Justice Peter Vivian Daniel in a concurring opinion in the 1857 case Dred Scott v. Sandford, quoted an English-language translation of Emerich de Vattel's 1758 treatise The Law of Nations (Le Droit des gens) for a definition of natural-born citizen: "The natives, or natural-born citizens, are those born in the country of parents who are citizens".

In 1875, Chief Justice Waite, in the voting-rights case Minor v. Happersett, stated:

"The Constitution does not, in words, say who shall be natural-born citizens. Resort must be had elsewhere to ascertain that. At common-law, with the nomenclature of which the framers of the Constitution were familiar, it was never doubted that all children born in a country of parents who were its citizens became themselves, upon their birth, citizens also. These were natives, or natural-born citizens, as distinguished from aliens or foreigners. Some authorities go further and include as citizens children born within the jurisdiction without reference to the citizenship of their parents. As to this class there have been doubts, but never as to the first."

The U.S. Supreme Court decision in United States v. Wong Kim Ark (1898), citing Lynch as a leading precedent, held a child born in the United States of two Chinese parents became "at the time of his birth a citizen of the United States". (Note: U.S. v. Wong Kim Ark (1898) 169 U.S. 649, 42 L.Ed. 890, 18 S.Ct. 456.)

==== 1900s ====
Consistent with the earlier decisions, in 1939, the U.S. Supreme Court stated in its decision in Perkins v. Elg that a person born in the United States and raised in another country was a natural born citizen, and specifically stated that they could "become President of the United States". The case was regarding a young woman, born in New York a year after her father became a naturalized U.S. citizen. However, when she was about four her parents returned to Sweden taking her with them, and they stayed in Sweden. At age 20, she contacted the American embassy in Sweden and, shortly after her 21st birthday, returned to the United States on a U.S. passport and was admitted as a U.S. citizen. Years later, while she was still in the United States, her father in Sweden relinquished his United States citizenship, and, because of that, the Department of Labor (then the location of the Immigration & Naturalization Service) declared her a non-citizen and tried to deport her. The young woman filed suit for a declaratory judgment that she was an U.S. citizen by birth. She won at the trial level, and at the circuit court—where she was repeatedly described as "a natural born citizen" — and finally in the U.S. Supreme Court, where the court decision quoted at length from the U.S. Attorney General's opinion in Steinkauler's Case (mentioned in the next section #Government_officials'_interpretations) including the comment that a person born in the United States and raised in another country could yet "become President of the United States".

Some federal cases argued for a narrow reading of the Fourteenth Amendment, according to which U.S. citizens were necessarily either born or naturalized in the United States, and any citizen who was not born in the United States must have been naturalized by operation of law, even if such naturalization was "automatic" at birth. In this view, such a person should not be considered a natural born citizen, but rather a "naturalized" citizen who is not eligible for the Presidency.

In 1951, the U.S. Court of Appeals for the Tenth Circuit noted in Zimmer v. Acheson that "[t]here are only two classes of citizens of the United States, native-born citizens and naturalized citizens", quoting a dictum by Justice Gray from Elk v. Wilkins (1884) and United States v. Wong Kim Ark (1898). The court ruled that Zimmer, who was born abroad in 1905 to a U.S. citizen father and a noncitizen mother, was himself a citizen under the nationality law in force at the time of his birth, but "his status as a citizen was that of a naturalized citizen and not a native-born citizen". In 1971, the Court encountered a similar situation in Rogers v. Bellei, where the individual in question was born after 1934 and so was granted automatic U.S. citizenship, though subject to residence requirements and was subject to expatriation. The Court "appeared to assume or imply that such persons became citizens at birth by way of naturalization".

In a 1999 Circuit Court decision, the U.S.-born children of two non-citizen parents were spoken of as "natural born citizens". (Note: Mustata v. US Dept. of Justice (6th Cir. 1999) 179 F.3d 1017, 1019.)

==== 2000s ====
More recent cases, particularly Nguyen v. INS and Robinson v. Bowen, suggested that the Fourteenth Amendment merely establishes a "floor" for birthright citizenship, and this category may be expanded by Congress.

In 2009 in Ankeny v. Governor, the Indiana Court of Appeals reaffirmed that persons born within the borders of the United States are "natural born Citizens", regardless of the citizenship of their parents. The court referred to the case of Wong Kim Ark, and provides a compilation of the arguments pertaining to this topic.

A clarification to this interpretation was made in 2010, where a three-judge panel of the United States Court of Appeals for the Fifth Circuit held that natural born citizens can lose their citizenship if their territory of birth later ceases to be U.S. territory. The case involved a Philippine-born litigant who could not claim U.S. citizenship on the basis of his parents, who lived all their lives in the Philippines, because they were born while the Philippines was U.S. territory prior to being given its independence. The Courts for the Second, Third, and Ninth Circuits have also held that birth in the Philippines at a time when the country was a territory of the United States does not constitute birth "in the United States" under the Citizenship Clause, and thus did not give rise to United States citizenship.

In a 2012 New York case, Strunk v. N.Y. State Board of Elections, the pro se plaintiff challenged Barack Obama's presence on the presidential ballot, based on his own interpretation that "natural born citizen" required the president "to have been born on United States soil and have two United States born parents" (emphasis added). To this the Court responded, "Article II, section 1, clause 5 does not state this. No legal authority has ever stated that the Natural Born Citizen clause means what plaintiff Strunk claims it says. ... Moreover, President Obama is the sixth U.S. President to have had one or both of his parents not born on U.S. soil". The opinion then listed Andrew Jackson, James Buchanan, Chester A. Arthur, Woodrow Wilson, and Herbert Hoover.

=== Government officials' interpretations ===
==== 1800s ====
John Armor Bingham, the American lawyer and politician who framed the 14th Amendment, held to the belief that natural born should be interpreted as born in the United States. In 1862, during the 37th United States Congress in the House of Representatives he stated:

The Constitution leaves no room for doubt upon this subject. The words "natural born citizen of the United States" appear in it, and the other provision appears in it that, "Congress shall have power to pass a uniform system of naturalization." To naturalize a person is to admit him to citizenship. Who are natural born citizens but those born within the Republic? Those born within the Republic, whether black or white, are citizens by birth—natural born citizens.

He expanded his statement four years later on 9 March 1866, emphasizing twice that this required a man born to "parents not owing allegiance to any foreign sovereignty" so he would be "not owing a foreign allegiance".

I find no fault with the introductory clause, which is simply declaratory of what is written in the Constitution, that every human being born within the jurisdiction of the United States of parents not owing allegiance to any foreign sovereignty is, in the language of your Constitution itself, a natural-born citizen; but, sir, I may be allowed to say further that I deny that the Congress of the United States ever had the power, or color of power to say that any man born within the jurisdiction of the United States, not owing a foreign allegiance, is not and shall not be a citizen of the United States. Citizenship is his birthright and neither the Congress nor the States can justly or lawfully take it from him.

After the passage of the amendment on 9 July 1868, Bingham made reference to his previous statements again in the 42nd United States Congress of 1872, during a House debate.

Edward Bates also held to the belief that "natural born" should be interpreted as "born in the United States". He also indicated that those born in the United States to alien parents, even if they reside elsewhere, are still considered natural born. In 1862, Secretary of the Treasury Salmon P. Chase sent a query to Attorney General Edward Bates asking whether or not "colored men" can be citizens of the United States. The question arose because the Coast Guard had detained a schooner commanded by a free "colored man" who claimed he was a citizen of the United States. If he were a U.S. citizen the boat could be released, but otherwise—then during the Civil War—it would be confiscated. No information about the man's birth or parentage was provided. Bates responded on November 29, 1862, with a 27-page opinion — considered of such importance that the government published it not only in the official volumes of Attorney-General opinions but also as a separate booklet — concluding,

I conclude that the free man of color, mentioned in your letter, if born in the United States, is a citizen of the United States. [italics in original]

In the course of that opinion, Bates commented at some length on the nature of citizenship, and wrote,

... our constitution, in speaking of natural born citizens, uses no affirmative language to make them such, but only recognizes and reaffirms the universal principle, common to all nations, and as old as political society, that the people born in a country do constitute the nation, and, as individuals, are natural members of the body politic. [italics in original]

In another opinion, dated September 1, 1862, Bates dealt with a question from the Secretary of State, of whether a person born in the U.S. to two non-citizens, who is taken with them back to their country, could, years later, re-enter the United States as of right, as a U.S. citizen. Bates wrote:

I am quite clear in the opinion that children born in the United States of alien parents, who have never been naturalized, are native-born citizens of the United States, and, of course, do not require the formality of naturalization to entitle them to the rights and privileges of such citizenship. I might sustain this opinion by a reference to the well-settled principle of the common law of England on this subject; to the writings of many of the earlier and later commentators on our Constitution and laws; ... and lastly to the dicta and decisions of many of our national and state tribunals. But all this has been well done by Assistant Vice Chancellor Sandford, in the case of Lynch vs. Clarke, and I forbear. I refer to his opinion for a full and clear statement of the principle, and of the reasons and authorities for its support.

Unlike Edward Bates, U.S. Secretary of State William Learned Marcy was equivocal about whether those born in the country of alien parents and who reside elsewhere are still considered citizens. In 1854 Marcy wrote John Y. Mason, the U.S. Minister to France:

In reply to the inquiry ... whether "the children of foreign parents born in the United States, but brought to the country of which the father is a subject, and continuing to reside within the jurisdiction of their father's country, are entitled to protection as citizens of the United States", I have to observe that it is presumed that, according to the common law, any person born in the United States, unless he be born in one of the foreign legations therein, may be considered a citizen thereof until he formally renounces his citizenship. There is not, however any United States statute containing a provision upon this subject, nor, so far as I am aware, has there been any judicial decision in regard to it.

U.S. Attorney General Edwards Pierrepont, however, shared Edward Bates' opinion that those born in the country of alien parents and who reside elsewhere are still considered citizens, and he added that they should be entitled to be president of the United States, if elected. In 1875 Pierrepont was presented with a query from the Secretary of State, Hamilton Fish. A young man, named Arthur Steinkauler, had been born in Missouri in 1855, a year after his father was naturalized a U.S. citizen. When he was four years old, his father returned to Germany with him and both had stayed there ever since. The father had relinquished his U.S. citizenship and the young man was now 20 years old and about to be drafted into the Imperial German army. The question was asked "What was this young man's situation as a native-born American citizen?" After studying the relevant legal authorities, Pierrepont wrote:

Under the treaty [of 1868 with Germany], and in harmony with American doctrine, it is clear that Steinkauler the father abandoned his naturalization in America and became a German subject (his son being yet a minor), and that by virtue of German laws the son acquired German nationality. It is equally clear that the son, by birth, has American nationality, and hence he has two nationalities, one natural, the other acquired ... Young Steinkauler is a native-born American citizen. There is no law of the United States under which his father or any other person can deprive him of his birthright. He can return to America at the age of 21, and in due time, if the people elect, he can become President of the United States. ... I am of opinion that when he reaches the age of 21 years he can then elect whether he will return and take the nationality of his birth, with its duties and privileges, or retain the nationality acquired by the act of his father.

==== 1900s ====
Frederick van Dyne, the Assistant Solicitor of the U.S. Department of State (1900–1907) indicated that children of citizens born outside the United States are also considered citizens. In 1904, he published a textbook, Citizenship of the United States, in which he wrote:

There is no uniform rule of international law covering the subject of citizenship. Every nation determines for itself who shall, and who shall not, be its citizens. ... By the law of the United States, citizenship depends, generally, on the place of birth; nevertheless the children of citizens, born out of the jurisdiction of the United States, are also citizens. ... The Constitution of the United States, while it recognized citizenship of the United States in prescribing the qualifications of the President, Senators, and Representatives, contained no definition of citizenship until the adoption of the 14th Amendment, in 1868; nor did Congress attempt to define it until the passage of the civil rights act, in 1866. ... Prior to this time the subject of citizenship by birth was generally held to be regulated by the common law, by which all persons born within the limits and allegiance of the United States were deemed natural-born citizens. It was assumed by the Supreme Court of the United States in the case of Murray v. The Charming Betsy (1804) 2 Cranch (6 U.S.) 64, 119, 2 L.Ed. 208, 226, that all persons born in the United States were citizens thereof. ... In M'Creery v. Somerville (1824) 9 Wheat. (22 U.S.) 354, 6 L.Ed. 109, which concerned the title to land in the state of Maryland, it was assumed that children born in that state to an alien were native-born citizens of the United States. ... The Federal courts have almost uniformly held that birth in the United States, of itself, confers citizenship.

=== Academic interpretations ===
==== 1800s ====
William Rawle, formerly the U.S. Attorney for Pennsylvania (1791–1799), defined natural born citizen as every person born within the United States, regardless of the citizenship of their parents. In an 1825 treatise, A View of the Constitution of the United States of America, he wrote:

The citizens of each state constituted the citizens of the United States when the Constitution was adopted. ... [He] who was subsequently born the citizen of a State, became at the moment of his birth a citizen of the United States. Therefore every person born within the United States, its territories or districts, whether the parents are citizens or aliens, is a natural born citizen in the sense of the Constitution, and entitled to all the rights and privileges appertaining to that capacity. ... Under our Constitution the question is settled by its express language, and when we are informed ... no person is eligible to the office of President unless he is a natural born citizen, the principle that the place of birth creates the relative quality is established as to us.

James F. Wilson agreed with Rawle's opinion, but added the exclusion of visiting foreign diplomats. During an 1866 House debate, he quoted Rawle's opinion, and also referred to the "general law relating to subjects and citizens recognized by all nations", saying:

... and that must lead us to the conclusion that every person born in the United States is a natural-born citizen of such States, except it may be that children born on our soil to temporary sojourners or representatives of foreign Governments, are native-born citizens of the United States.

Joseph Story, an Associate Justice of the U.S. Supreme Court (1812-1845), said that the term native citizen is synonymous with natural born citizen, though he does not define either term. Twice (1834 in "Constitutional Class Book" then 1840 in "A Familiar Exposition of the Constitution of the United States:") he wrote:

It is not too much to say that no one, but a native citizen, ought ordinarily to be [e]ntrusted with an office so vital to the safety and liberties of the people.

==== 1900s ====
Alexander Porter Morse, the lawyer who represented Louisiana in Plessy v. Ferguson, considered this connection between native born and natural born to signify that only a child of citizens should be allowed to run for president. In the Albany Law Journal, he wrote:

If it was intended that anybody who was a citizen by birth should be eligible, it would only have been necessary to say, "no person, except a native-born citizen"; but the framers thought it wise, in view of the probable influx of European immigration, to provide that the president should at least be the child of citizens owing allegiance to the United States at the time of his birth. It may be observed in passing that the current phrase "native-born citizen" is well understood; but it is pleonasm and should be discarded; and the correct designation, "native citizen" should be substituted in all constitutional and statutory enactments, in judicial decisions and in legal discussions where accuracy and precise language are essential to intelligent discussion.

The 2nd Edition of Black's Law Dictionary in 1910 defined "native" as a "natural-born subject or citizen; a denizen by birth; one who owes his domicile or citizenship to the fact of his birth within the country referred to. The term may also include one born abroad, if his parents were then citizens of the country, and not permanently residing in foreign parts."

==== 2000s ====
The 9th Edition of Black's Law Dictionary, published in 2009, defined "natural-born citizen" as "A person born within the jurisdiction of a national government".

===== Foreign soil and territories =====
In 2000, the Congressional Research Service (CRS), in one of its reports, wrote that most constitutional scholars interpret the natural-born-citizen clause to include citizens born outside the United States to parents who are U.S. citizens. This same CRS report also asserts that citizens born in the District of Columbia, Guam, Puerto Rico, and the U.S. Virgin Islands, are legally defined as "natural born" citizens and are, therefore, also eligible to be elected president.

This opinion was reaffirmed in a 2009 CRS report, which stated:

Considering the history of the constitutional qualifications provision, the common use and meaning of the phrase "natural-born subject" in England and in the Colonies in the 1700s, the clause's apparent intent, the subsequent action of the first Congress in enacting the Naturalization Act of 1790 (expressly defining the term "natural born citizen" to include a person born abroad to parents who are United States citizens), as well as subsequent Supreme Court dicta, it appears that the most logical inferences would indicate that the phrase "natural born Citizen" would mean a person who is entitled to U.S. citizenship "at birth" or "by birth".

The interpretation of natural born being the equivalent of a citizen at birth was repeated in a 2011 CRS report and a 2016 CRS report. The 2011 report stated:

The weight of legal and historical authority indicates that the term "natural born" citizen would mean a person who is entitled to U.S. citizenship "by birth" or "at birth," either by being born "in" the United States and under its jurisdiction, even those born to alien parents; by being born abroad to U.S. citizen-parents; or by being born in other situations meeting legal requirements for U.S. citizenship "at birth". Such term, however, would not include a person who was not a U.S. citizen by birth or at birth, and who was thus born an "alien" required to go through the legal process of "naturalization" to become a U.S. citizen.

The 2016 report similarly stated:

Although the eligibility of U.S. born citizens has been settled law for more than a century, there have been legitimate legal issues raised concerning those born outside of the country to U.S. citizens. From historical material and case law, it appears that the common understanding of the term "natural born" in England and in the American colonies in the 1700s included both the strict common law meaning as born in the territory (jus soli), as well as the statutory laws adopted in England since at least 1350, which included children born abroad to British fathers (jus sanguinis, the law of descent). Legal scholars in the field of citizenship have asserted that this common understanding and legal meaning in England and in the American colonies was incorporated into the usage and intent of the term in the U.S. Constitution to include those who are citizens at birth.

Gabriel J. Chin, Professor of Law at UC Davis School of Law, held the opinion that the term "natural born" is ambiguous and citizenship-granting authority has changed over the years. He notes that persons born outside the United States to U.S.-citizen parents have not always been born citizens. For example, foreign-born children of persons who became citizens between April 14, 1802, and 1854 were aliens. He also believed that children born in the Panama Canal Zone to at least one U.S. then-citizen before August 4, 1937, when Congress granted citizenship to all such persons, were born without American citizenship.

1. Congress possesses the authority either
  - to grant not only citizenship (as is undisputed) but the more specific status of a "natural born" citizen, with an affirmative answer raising the question of whether it can also act to remove that status (and thereby disqualify individuals from the Presidency through action short of stripping them of their citizenship),
    or
  - to issue "declarations" regarding the meaning of preexisting law (in this case, U.S. citizenship law between the aforementioned dates) and having binding authority, a claim likely to violate separation of powers given the Constitution's provisions in Article III that "[t]he judicial Power of the United States[] shall be vested in one supreme Court[] and in such inferior Courts as the Congress may from time to time ordain and establish" (Section 1) and that "[t]he judicial power shall extend to all cases, in law and equity, arising under this Constitution, the laws of the United States, and treaties made, or which shall be made, under their authority" (Section 2)
  and
2. the statute (currently codified at 8 U.S.C. § 1403(a)) – which states only that "any person [fitting the above description] is declared to be a citizen of the United States" and neither
  - expressly claims that its declaration (whether a grant or an interpretation) has retroactive rather than merely prospective effect (contrast the locution "to have been a citizen of the United States [from birth]")
    nor
  - in any way mentions "natural born" status (instead conferring or recognizing the preexistence only of "citizen[ship]" generally) –
    in fact grants or recognizes citizenship from birth, let alone status as a natural born citizen (to whatever extent the requirements of that status exceed those for citizenship from birth).

In 2009, G. Edward "Ted" White, Professor of Law at the University of Virginia, stated the term refers to anyone born on U.S. soil or anyone born on foreign soil to American citizen parents.

Unlike Chin and White, Mary McManamon, Professor of Law at Widener University School of Law, has argued in the Catholic University Law Review that, aside from children born to foreign ambassadors or to hostile soldiers on U.S. territory, both of whom owe allegiance to a different sovereign, a natural born citizen must be born in the United States. She claims that common law provides an exception for the children of U.S. ambassadors born abroad and the children of American soldiers while engaged in hostilities. Thus, with these two limited exceptions, she equates "natural born" with "native born".

Professor Einer Elhauge of Harvard Law School agrees with Professor McManamon that "natural born" means "native born" and therefore the wording of the Constitution "does not permit his [Ted Cruz's] candidacy". (Cruz was born in Canada to one U.S. citizen parent.) Professor Robert Clinton at the Sandra Day O'Connor College of Law at Arizona State University is also of the opinion that "natural born citizen" means "born in the United States." University of Chicago Professor Eric Posner also concludes that "natural born citizen" means a "person born in the (United States)". Former Chief Justice of the New York Court of Appeals, Sol Wachtler, concludes the same. Their conclusion is consistent with the position that the eighteenth century legal usage of the term "shall be considered as natural born" in the Naturalization Act of 1790 merely naturalized persons or granted them limited rights of the natural born.

Joseph Dellapenna, retired Professor of Law at Villanova University, also considers "natural born" to encompass only persons born in the United States; argues that foreign-born children of U.S. citizens are naturalized at birth, but not natural born; and on this basis rejects the presidential eligibility of both Ted Cruz and John McCain. Citing Rogers v. Bellei in support of this interpretation, Dellapenna asserts that "Without addressing this judicial holding, any conclusion that 'natural born citizen' includes any person who becomes a citizen at birth is insupportable."

===== American soil =====
There is consensus among academics that those born on American soil, except children born to foreign ambassadors or to hostile soldiers on U.S. territory, both of whom owe allegiance to a different sovereign, are natural born citizens, or jus soli, regardless of parental citizenship status.

In a 2008 article published by the Michigan Law Review, Lawrence Solum, Professor of Law at the University of Illinois, stated that "there is general agreement on the core of [the] meaning [of the Presidential Eligibility Clause]. Anyone born on American soil whose parents are citizens of the United States is a 'natural born citizen'". In April 2010, Solum republished the same article as an online draft, in which he clarified his original statement so that it would not be misunderstood as excluding the children of one citizen parent. In a footnote he explained, "based on my reading of the historical sources, there is no credible case that a person born on American soil with one American parent was clearly not a 'natural born citizen'." He further extended natural born citizenship to all cases of jus soli as the "conventional view". Although Solum stated elsewhere that the two-citizen-parents arguments were not "crazy", he believes "the much stronger argument suggests that if you were born on American soil that you would be considered a natural born citizen".

Ronald Rotunda, Professor of Law at Chapman University, has remarked "There's [sic] some people who say that both parents need to be citizens. That's never been the law."

Polly Price, Professor of Law at Emory University, has commented "It's a little confusing, but most scholars think it's a pretty unusual position for anyone to think the natural born citizen clause would exclude someone born in the U.S."

Chin concurred with that assessment, stating, "there is agreement that 'natural born citizens' include those made citizens by birth under the 14th Amendment."

Similarly, Eugene Volokh, Professor of Law at UCLA, found "quite persuasive" the reasoning employed by the Indiana Court of Appeals, which had concluded "that persons born within the borders of the United States are 'natural born Citizens' for Article II, Section 1 purposes, regardless of the citizenship of their parents".

Daniel Tokaji, Professor of Law at Ohio State University, agrees the citizenship status of a U.S.-born candidate's parents is irrelevant.

===== Implied repeal of the natural-born citizen clause =====
In a 2006 John Marshall Law Review article, Paul A. Clark argues that the Fifth Amendment should be read as implicitly repealing the requirement that the U.S. president needs to be a natural-born U.S. citizen. Clark points out that, starting from the 1954 case Bolling v. Sharpe, courts have held that the Fifth Amendment contains an implicit equal protection clause whose scope is identical to the Fourteenth Amendment's equal protection clause and that federal discrimination against naturalized U.S. citizens (or, more specifically, federal discrimination based on national origin) would be struck down by the courts as being in violation of the Fifth Amendment. Since the requirement that the U.S. president needs to be a natural-born U.S. citizen is a form of discrimination based on national origin, Clark argues that the courts should strike down this requirement. So far, Clark's argument in regards to this has not attracted wide support among the U.S. legal academy (though Professor Josh Blackman asked a question about a similar topic in 2015—specifically about the Fourteenth Amendment nullifying the natural-born citizen clause).

United States law professor Laurence Tribe has made a similar argument in a September 2016 article of his, but using the Fourteenth Amendment instead of the Fifth Amendment. Specifically, Tribe argues that the U.S. Congress should use the Fourteenth Amendment's Enforcement Clause to pass a statute that would allow naturalized U.S. citizens to run for and to become U.S. president. Tribe argues that while the constitutionality of such a Congressional statute would not be easy to defend, such a statute would at least be consistent with the spirit of the Reconstruction Amendments to the United States Constitution. Tribe also points out that, in some 1960s cases (such as Katzenbach v. Morgan and Jones v. Mayer), the U.S. Supreme Court ruled that the U.S. Congress has the authority to interpret the 14th Amendment (through enforcement legislation) more broadly than the U.S. Supreme Court itself has interpreted this amendment. Tribe points out that a similar logic could be used by a future U.S. Supreme Court to uphold a hypothetical Congressional statute that allows naturalized U.S. citizens to run for and to become U.S. president.

== Eligibility challenges ==
Several courts have ruled that private citizens do not have standing to challenge the eligibility of candidates to appear on a presidential election ballot. Alternatively, there is a statutory method by which the eligibility of the president-elect of the United States to take office may be challenged in Congress. Some legal scholars assert that, even if eligibility challenges are nonjusticiable in federal courts, and are not undertaken in Congress, there are other avenues for adjudication, such as an action in state court in regard to ballot access.

Every president to date was either a citizen at the adoption of the Constitution in 1789 or born in the United States; of the former group, all except one had two parents with citizenship in what would become the U.S. (Andrew Jackson). Of those in the latter group, every president except two (Chester A. Arthur and Barack Obama) had two U.S.-citizen parents. Further, four additional U.S. presidents had one or both of his U.S.-citizen parents not born on U.S. soil (James Buchanan, Woodrow Wilson, Herbert Hoover, and Donald Trump).

Some presidential candidates were not born in a U.S. state or did not have two U.S.-citizen parents. In addition, one U.S. vice president (Al Gore) was born in Washington, D.C., and another (Charles Curtis) was born in the Kansas Territory; Vice President Kamala Harris's parents were not U.S. citizens at the time of her birth. This does not necessarily mean that these officeholders or candidates were ineligible, only that there was some controversy about their eligibility, which may have been resolved in favor of eligibility.

The only sitting President to have accepted an offer of citizenship from a foreign state was Abraham Lincoln, who received an offer of honorary citizenship from San Marino by letter on March 29, 1861, and on May 7 replied: "I thank the Council of San Marino for the honor of citizenship they have conferred upon me."

=== 1800s ===
==== Chester A. Arthur ====
Chester A. Arthur, who was sworn in as president when James A. Garfield died after being shot, was rumored to have been born in Canada.

Arthur was born in Vermont on October 5, 1829 to a Vermont-born mother and a father from Ireland (who later became a U.S. citizen, 14 years after Arthur was born). His mother, Malvina Stone Arthur, was a native of Berkshire, Vermont, who moved with her family to Quebec, where she met and married the future president's father, William Arthur, on April 12, 1821. After the family had settled in Fairfield, Vermont, somewhere between 1822 and 1824, William Arthur traveled with his eldest daughter to East Stanbridge, Canada, in October 1830 and commuted to Fairfield on Sundays to preach. "It appears that he traveled regularly between the two villages, both of which were close to the Canada–US border, for about eighteen months, holding two jobs", which may well explain the confusion about Chester A. Arthur's place of birth, as perhaps did the fact that he was born in Franklin County, and thus within a day's walk of the Vermont–Quebec border. Moreover, Chester A. Arthur himself added a bit of confusion into the record by sometimes reporting his birth year as 1830.

No evidence of his having been born in Canada was ever demonstrated by his Democratic opponents, although Arthur Hinman, an attorney who had investigated Arthur's family history, raised the allegation as an objection during his vice-presidential campaign and, after the end of his presidency, published a book on the subject.

==== Fictional character Christopher Schürmann ====
In "The Presidential Campaign of 1896," a work of satire by George Lynd Catlin describing an imaginary presidential election and published in 1888, a fictional Christopher Schürmann (born in New York City) was the candidate of the fictional Labor Party during the 1896 presidential election, defeated by candidate Charles Francis Adams of the fictional National Party. Some people have mistaken this fictional Schürmann, whose eligibility was questioned in the book, for a real person.

=== 1900s ===
==== Charles Evans Hughes ====
The eligibility of Charles Evans Hughes was questioned in an article written by Breckinridge Long, one of Woodrow Wilson's campaign workers, and published on December 7, 1916 in the Chicago Legal News — a full month after the U.S. presidential election of 1916, in which Hughes was narrowly defeated by Woodrow Wilson. Long claimed that Hughes was ineligible because his father was not yet naturalized at the time of his birth and was still a British citizen. Observing that Hughes, although born in the United States, was also (according to British law) a British subject and therefore "enjoy[ed] a dual nationality and owe[d] a double allegiance", Long argued that a native born citizen was not natural born without a unity of U.S. citizenship and allegiance and stated: "Now if, by any possible construction, a person at the instant of birth, and for any period of time thereafter, owes, or may owe, allegiance to any sovereign but the United States, he is not a 'natural-born' citizen of the United States."

==== Barry Goldwater ====
Barry Goldwater was born in Phoenix, in what was then the incorporated Arizona Territory of the United States. During his presidential campaign in 1964, there was a minor controversy over Goldwater's having been born in Arizona three years before it became a state. Attorney Melvin Belli unsuccessfully sought to have Goldwater removed from the California ballot.

==== George Romney ====
George W. Romney, who ran for the Republican party presidential nomination in 1968, was born in Mexico to American parents. Romney's grandfather, a member of the Church of Jesus Christ of Latter-day Saints, had emigrated to Mexico in 1886 with his three wives and their children, after the U.S. federal government outlawed polygamy. However, Romney's parents (monogamous under new church doctrine) retained their U.S. citizenship and returned to the United States with him and his siblings in 1912. Romney's eligibility for president became moot when Richard Nixon was nominated as the Republican presidential candidate.

==== Lowell Weicker ====
Lowell P. Weicker entered the race for the Republican party nomination of 1980 but dropped out before voting in the primaries began; he was also suggested as a possible vice-presidential nominee in 1976, to replace retiring Vice President Nelson Rockefeller under the Republican ticket of incumbent President Gerald Ford. However Senator Bob Dole from Kansas was later chosen as the nominee. Weicker was born in Paris, France, to parents who were U.S. citizens. His father was an executive for E. R. Squibb & Sons and his mother was born in India, the daughter of a British general.

=== 2000s ===
==== John McCain ====
John McCain was born in 1936 at Coco Solo, Naval Air Station in the Panama Canal Zone. McCain's eligibility for the presidency was not challenged during his 2000 campaign, but it was challenged during his 2008 campaign.

McCain never released his birth certificate to the press or independent fact-checking organizations, but in 2008 one was shown to Washington Post reporter Michael Dobbs, who wrote, "[A] senior official of the McCain campaign showed me a copy of [McCain's] birth certificate issued by the 'family hospital' in the Coco Solo submarine base." A lawsuit filed by Fred Hollander in 2008 alleged McCain was actually born in a civilian hospital in Colón, Panama. Dobbs wrote that in his autobiography, Faith of My Fathers, McCain wrote that he was born "in the Canal Zone" at the U.S. Naval Air Station in Coco Solo, which was under the command of his grandfather, John S. McCain Sr. "The senator's father, John S. McCain Jr., was an executive officer on a submarine, also based in Coco Solo. His mother, Roberta McCain, has said that she has vivid memories of lying in bed listening to raucous celebrations of her son's birth from the nearby officers' club. The birth was announced days later in the English-language Panamanian American newspaper."

The former unincorporated territory of the Panama Canal Zone and its related military facilities were not regarded as United States territory at the time, but 8 U.S.C. § 1403, which became law in 1937, retroactively conferred citizenship on individuals born within the Canal Zone on or after February 26, 1904, and on individuals born in the Republic of Panama on or after that date who had at least one U.S. citizen parent employed by the U.S. government or the Panama Railway Company; 8 U.S.C. § 1403 was cited in Judge William Alsup's 2008 ruling, described below. A March 2008 paper by former Solicitor General Ted Olson and Harvard Law Professor Laurence H. Tribe opined that McCain was eligible for the Presidency. On April 30, 2008, the U.S. Senate, of which McCain was a member at the time, approved a non-binding resolution by unanimous consent recognizing McCain's status as a natural-born citizen; then-Senator Barack Obama, who went on to defeat McCain in that year's presidential election, cosponsored the resolution. In September 2008, U.S. District Judge William Alsup stated obiter in his ruling that it is "highly probable" that McCain is a natural-born citizen from birth by virtue of 8 U.S.C. § 1401, although he acknowledged the alternative possibility that McCain became a natural-born citizen retroactively, by way of 8 U.S.C. § 1403.

These views have been criticized by Chin, who argues that McCain was at birth a citizen of Panama and was only retroactively declared a born citizen under 8 U.S.C. § 1403, because at the time of his birth and with regard to the Canal Zone the Supreme Court's Insular Cases overruled the Naturalization Act of 1795, which would otherwise have declared McCain a U.S. citizen immediately at birth. The U.S. State Department's Foreign Affairs Manual states that children born in the Panama Canal Zone at certain times became U.S. nationals without citizenship. In Rogers v. Bellei, the Supreme Court ruled that children "born abroad of American parents" are not citizens within the citizenship clause of the 14th Amendment but did not elaborate on their natural-born status. Similarly, legal scholar Lawrence Solum concluded in an article on the natural born citizen clause that the question of McCain's eligibility could not be answered with certainty, and that it would depend on the particular approach of "constitutional construction".

==== Barack Obama ====
Barack Obama was born in 1961 in Honolulu, Hawaii (which had become a U.S. state in 1959). His mother was a U.S. citizen and his father was a British subject from British Kenya. Before and after the 2008 presidential election, claims were made that Obama was not a natural-born citizen. On June 12, 2008, the Obama presidential campaign launched a website to counter what it described as a smear campaign by his opponents, including conspiracy theories challenging his eligibility. The most prominent issue raised against Obama was the claim made in several lawsuits that he was not actually born in Hawaii. On October 31, 2008, Hawaii Health Director Chiyome Fukino issued a statement saying,

I ... have personally seen and verified that the Hawai'i State Department of Health has Sen. Obama's original birth certificate on record in accordance with state policies and procedures.

On July 27, 2009, Fukino issued an additional statement:

I ... have seen the original vital records maintained on file by the Hawaii State Department of Health verifying Barack Hussein Obama was born in Hawaii and is a natural-born American citizen.

Most of the cases were dismissed because of the plaintiff's lack of standing; however, several courts have given guidance on the question. In Ankeny v. Governor, a three-member Indiana Court of Appeals stated,

Based upon the language of Article II, Section 1, Clause 4 and the guidance provided by Wong Kim Ark, we conclude that persons born within the borders of the United States are 'natural born Citizens' for Article II, Section 1 purposes, regardless of the citizenship of their parents.

Administrative law Judge Michael Malihi in Georgia decided a group of eligibility challenge cases by saying, "The Indiana Court rejected the argument that Mr. Obama was ineligible, stating that the children born within the United States are natural born citizens, regardless of the citizenship of their parents. ... This Court finds the decision and analysis of Ankeny persuasive." Federal District Judge John A. Gibney, Jr. wrote in his decision in the case of Tisdale v. Obama:

The eligibility requirements to be President of the United States are such that the individual must be a "natural born citizen" of the United States ... It is well settled that those born in the United States are considered natural born citizens. See, e.g. United States v. Ark [sic] ...

The Supreme Court declined without comment to hear two lawsuits in which the plaintiffs argued it was irrelevant whether Obama was born in Hawaii. Attempts to prevent Obama from participating in the 2012 Democratic Party presidential primaries in several states failed.

==== Marco Rubio and Bobby Jindal ====
Marco Rubio and Bobby Jindal both announced in 2015 that they were running for the Republican Party's nomination for president in the 2016 election. Orly Taitz and Mario Apuzzo, who both had filed multiple lawsuits challenging Obama's eligibility, claimed neither Rubio nor Jindal is eligible because both were born (albeit in the United States) to parents who were not U.S. citizens at the time of their respective births. A lawsuit filed in December 2015 in Vermont and a ballot challenge filed in February 2016 in New York challenged Jindal's eligibility.

A November 2015 ballot challenge in New Hampshire alleging that Rubio was not a natural-born citizen was unsuccessful. In December, the following month, a similar lawsuit was filed in Vermont, and an unsuccessful lawsuit was filed in Florida. In January 2016, a similar unsuccessful ballot challenge was filed in Illinois. In February, a similar unsuccessful lawsuit was filed in Arkansas; a similar ballot challenge was filed in New York; and an unsuccessful ballot challenge was filed in Indiana.

==== Ted Cruz ====
Ted Cruz announced on March 22, 2015, that he was running for the Republican Party's nomination for president in the 2016 election. Cruz was born in Calgary, Alberta, Canada. Cruz's mother was a U.S. citizen. This gave Cruz dual Canadian-American citizenship, as he was granted U.S. citizenship at the time of his birth by the virtue of his mother's citizenship, and Canada grants birthright citizenship to every person born in Canada. Cruz's father was born in Cuba and eventually became a naturalized U.S. citizen in 2005. Cruz applied to formally renounce his Canadian citizenship and ceased being a citizen of Canada on May 14, 2014.

Former Solicitor General Paul Clement, former Acting Solicitor General Neal Katyal, University of California, Irvine School of Law Dean Erwin Chemerinsky, Temple University Law School Professor Peter Spiro, Professor Akhil Amar, Georgetown University Law Center Professor Randy Barnett, Yale Law School Professor Jack Balkin, and University of San Diego Professor Michael Ramsey believe Cruz meets the constitutional requirements to be eligible for the presidency. Similarly, Bryan Garner, the editor of Black's Law Dictionary, believes the U.S. Supreme Court would find Cruz to be eligible, and Case Western Reserve University School of Law professor Jonathan H. Adler agrees that no court will rule against Cruz's eligibility.

Laurence Tribe of Harvard, however, described Cruz's eligibility as "murky and unsettled". Harvard Law Professor Cass Sunstein believes that Cruz is eligible, but agrees with Ramsey that Cruz's eligibility is not "an easy question". Sunstein believes concerns over standing and the political-question doctrine make it unlikely that courts would rule against Cruz.

In 2013, Professor Chin (see above), stated Cruz "probably" was a natural-born citizen. In 2016, however, Chin suggested Cruz might not be a natural-born citizen because, under the law in effect at the time of his birth, Cruz's U.S. citizenship was only conditionally granted at the time of his birth and became permanent later in Cruz's life.

Mary McManamon (see above) writing in the Catholic University Law Review believes that Cruz is not eligible because he was not born in the United States. Professor Einer Elhauge of Harvard, Professor Robert Clinton of Arizona State University, University of Chicago Professor Eric Posner, former Chief Justice of the New York Court of Appeals Sol Wachtler, retired Professor Joseph Dellapenna of Villanova University, and Professor Victor Williams of Catholic University of America's law school agree that Cruz is not eligible. Alan Grayson, a former Democratic Congressman from Florida, does not believe Cruz is a natural-born citizen, and stated he would have filed a lawsuit if Cruz had become the Republican nominee. Larry Klayman, Taitz, and Apuzzo, who each filed multiple lawsuits challenging Obama's eligibility, have also asserted that Cruz is not eligible.

Cruz's eligibility was questioned by some of his primary opponents, including Donald Trump, Mike Huckabee, Rick Santorum, Carly Fiorina and Rand Paul. Marco Rubio, however, believes Cruz is eligible.

Two November 2015 ballot challenges in New Hampshire alleging that Cruz was not a natural-born citizen were unsuccessful. In December, a similar lawsuit was filed in Vermont, and an unsuccessful lawsuit was filed in Florida. In January 2016, similar lawsuits were unsuccessfully filed in Texas and Utah, and two similar unsuccessful ballot challenges were filed in Illinois. In February, two similar unsuccessful lawsuits were filed in Pennsylvania and one was filed in Arkansas; a similar lawsuit was filed in Alabama; similar unsuccessful ballot challenges were filed in Indiana; and similar ballot challenges and an unsuccessful similar lawsuit were also filed in New York. In March, a similar lawsuit was filed in New York. In April, a similar ballot challenge was unsuccessfully filed in New Jersey.

No lawsuit or challenge has been successful, and in February 2016, the Illinois Board of Elections ruled in Cruz's favor, stating, "The candidate is a natural born citizen by virtue of being born in Canada to his mother who was a U.S. citizen at the time of his birth."

==== Tulsi Gabbard ====
Tulsi Gabbard announced in 2019 that she was running for the Democratic Party's nomination for the 2020 United States presidential election. Gabbard was born in American Samoa; unlike some other U.S. territories, those born in American Samoa do not automatically acquire U.S. citizenship at birth. Gabbard's parents, however, were both U.S. citizens at the time of her birth: her mother was born in Indiana; her father was born in American Samoa to a father who was a U.S. citizen. The circumstances of Gabbard's birth have been compared to McCain and Cruz, neither of whom were born in the United States.

==== Kamala Harris ====
Kamala Harris was born in Oakland, California. In 2019, Harris unsuccessfully sought the Democratic Party's nomination for the 2020 United States presidential election. Donald Trump Jr. retweeted the statement "Kamala Harris is *not* an American Black. She is half Indian and half Jamaican." and then replied "Is this true? Wow." The tweets were interpreted to say that Harris was neither an American nor truly a Black woman.

On August 11, 2020, Democratic Party presidential nominee Joe Biden selected Harris as his running mate, and they were both elected in November that year. The vice-president must be a natural-born citizen, in the same manner as the president. UCLA professor Eugene Volokh said Harris is a natural-born citizen because she was born in the United States.

In a Newsweek op-ed, Chapman University professor John C. Eastman asked if Harris's parents were U.S. citizens or lawful permanent residents at the time of her birth or if they were temporary visitors, perhaps on student visas. He then stated that if they were temporary visitors, then "under the 14th Amendment as originally understood", she would not be considered a U.S. citizen at all—much less a natural-born citizen—and might not even be eligible for her then-current position in the Senate. President Donald Trump said "I just heard it today that she doesn't meet the requirements and by the way the lawyer that wrote that piece is a very highly qualified, very talented lawyer."

Responding to criticism it received, Newsweek's editors wrote that Eastman's "essay has no connection whatsoever to so-called 'birther-ism'". The response went on and stated, "the meaning of 'natural born Citizen', and the relation of that Article II textual requirement to the 14th Amendment's Citizenship Clause, are issues of legal interpretation about which scholars and commentators can, and will, robustly disagree." Newsweek also published Volokh's rebuttal to Eastman's essay. Colin Kalmbacher in Law & Crime responded to Eastman by saying that Eastman misstated "the state of the law – as well as the opinions of the legal community and the precedents of the courts – based on an incorrect reading of the" Supreme Court case United States v. Wong Kim Ark from 1898. Newsweek later apologized after receiving a strong negative reaction to the publication, saying they had "entirely failed to anticipate the ways in which the essay would be interpreted, distorted and weaponized" and that their publication of it "was intended to explore a minority legal argument about the definition of who is a 'natural-born citizen' in the United States. But to many readers, the essay inevitably conveyed the ugly message that Senator Kamala Harris, a woman of color and the child of immigrants, was somehow not truly American."

In November 2020, a federal district court opined in obiter dicta that Harris was a natural-born citizen.

On July 21, 2024, Biden announced he would not seek renomination. Numerous social media posts soon asserted that Harris, Biden's presumptive successor for the Democratic party's presidential nomination, was ineligible to serve as president. Some of those cited Eastman's 2020 article.

==== Nikki Haley ====
Nikki Haley, born of immigrant Indian parents in Bamberg, South Carolina sought the Republican Party's nomination for the 2024 United States presidential election. Roger Stone claimed Haley was not a natural-born citizen, citing an American Greatness article by Paul Ingrassia claiming this was because her parents were not American citizens when she was born. Trump, one of Haley's opponents for the Republican nomination, shared on social media a similar message. Geoffrey R. Stone, a professor of Law at the University of Chicago, called this claim "bonkers" because Haley was born in the United States. Writing for HuffPost, Jennifer Bendery suggested Trump's attack on Haley's citizenship, combined with his previous attacks on the citizenships of Obama, Cruz, and Harris, was motivated by racism.

== Polling ==
A 2016 CBS News poll found that only 21% of Americans would favor changing the Constitution to allow people who are not natural born U.S. citizens to become President, while 75% would oppose such a change.

== See also ==
- Jus sanguinis
- United States nationality law
- United States presidential eligibility legislation
- Natural-born-citizen clause
