= Native American policy of the Obama administration =

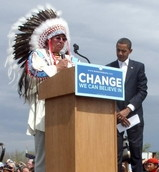
Carl Venne, Crow Indian Tribal Chairman, introduces Barack Obama, during his campaigning as a candidate for the Democratic Party's nomination in the 2008 United States presidential election.

The United States public policy agenda on issues affecting Native Americans under the Obama administration includes the signing of the Tribal Law and Order Act of 2010, which allowed tribal courts to extend and expand sentences handed down to them in criminal cases, strengthening tribal autonomy. President Obama also supported and enforced the Executive Order 13175, which requires the federal government to consult with tribal governments when deliberating over policies and programs that would affect tribal communities. Under the Obama Administration was also the launching of Michelle Obama's program Let's Move In Indian Country, which aims to improve opportunities for physical activity, to increase access to healthy food in tribal communities, and to create collaborations between private and public sectors to build programs that will end childhood obesity in Native communities. Obama also supported tribal communities through certain provisions of the American Recovery and Reinvestment Act of 2009, which allocated $510 million for rehabilitation of Native American housing, and the settlement of the Keepseagle case, a lawsuit against the United States Department of Agriculture for discriminating against tribal communities by not allowing them equal access to the USDA Farm Loan Program. Most recently, Obama signed Executive Order 13592, which seeks to improve educational opportunities for American Indian and Alaska Natives. Obama has been praised by many tribal leaders, including those who claim he has done more for Native Americans than all of his predecessors combined.

== Background ==
Many Native American peoples struggle to trust federal governments at all; as Tex "Red Tipped Arrow" Hall, tribal chairman of the Mandan, Hidatsa and Arikara Nation in North Dakota said, "our fathers and grandfathers and great grandfathers have gone to Washington, and there's been no promises made and no promises kept. That's why we’ve not trusted the federal government."

Government officials have also acknowledged the negative history between the federal government and tribal communities. In 2000, Kevin Gover publicly apologized for the actions of the Bureau of Indian Affairs, recognizing the traumatic impact that the department has historically caused for tribal communities, through policies including but not limited to extermination, relocation, and assimilation.

Obama has also personally acknowledged the history of violence, and during meetings with leaders from federally recognized tribes in 2009 he stated, "We know the history that we share. It's a history marked by violence and disease and deprivation. Treaties were violated. Promises were broken. You were told your lands, your religion, your cultures, your languages were not yours to keep."

== Public statements on Native American issues ==
Obama re-affirmed his commitment to government-to-government relations through his December 2, 2011 visits to reservations and meetings with tribal leaders during the signing of the Presidential Memorandum for the Implementation of Energy Saving Projects and Performance-Based Contracting for Energy Savings. Speaking of the broader progress under his administration, Obama stated, "I believe that one day, we’re going to be able to look back on these years and say that this was a turning point. This was the moment when we began to build a strong middle class in Indian Country; the moment when businesses, large and small, began opening up in reservations; the moment when we stopped repeating the mistakes of the past, and began building a better future together, one that honors old traditions and welcomes every Native American into the American Dream."

During his June 2014 visit with Standing Rock Sioux members, Obama focused on discussions concerning education and economic development and spoke of his personal commitment to improving federal-tribal relations. Obama's trip was one of only three presidential visitations to reservations in the history of the U.S.; before him, Bill Clinton was the last president to visit a reservation, in 1999. Obama later hosted the six Annual Tribal Nations Conferences in Washington D.C. where he spoke with not only Standing Rock members, but leaders that represented a span of the 566 federally recognized tribes.

== The White House Tribal Nations Conferences ==
The White House Tribal Nations Conference is an initiative created under the Barack Obama administration that aims to create dialogue between governments, give space for tribal leaders to bring issues that affect tribal communities to the attention of the United States federal government, and to make appropriate recommendations for policies and programs. The conferences were the first official attempt at dialogue since the Clinton administration, who held The Clinton 1994 Tribal Nations Conference.

=== First conference ===
The first of the conferences was held on November 5, 2009, with 400 tribal leaders in attendance. This initial conference was meant to recreate a channel for dialogue between tribal nations and the United States. The conference focused on broken treaties, economic development, natural resources, public safety, housing, education, and health.

=== Second conference ===
The Second Annual Tribal Nations Conference was held on December 16, 2010, with 500 attendees present. The conference focused on five major topics: restoring tribal homelands, building safer Native communities, building strong, prosperous tribal economies, fostering healthy communities and developing a structured and meaningful consultation policy. During President Obama's address to the attendees, he emphasized the importance of capacity building across a number of initiatives, including improving tribal economies, increasing job opportunities, creation of clean energy initiatives, and focus on health care and education. Obama said that addressing the health disparities in tribal communities was "not just a question of policy, it's a question of our values; it's a test of who we are as a nation."

=== Third conference ===
The Third Annual Tribal Nations Conference was held on December 6, 2011. The conference focused on economic development and sovereignty, as well as education, about which Obama commented, "We’re going to find ways to reduce the dropout rate. We’re going to help students who've already dropped out re-enter the education system. And we’re going to strengthen our tribal colleges and universities. They are cornerstones of their community and they deserve our support." It was during this conference that Obama signed Executive Order 13592, "Improving American Indian and Alaska Native Education Opportunities and Strengthening Tribal Colleges and Universities," which seeks to increase educational opportunities for Native youth through their academic career.

=== Fourth conference ===
The Fourth Annual Tribal Nations Conference was held on December 5, 2012. The conference highlighted topics including sacred sites, the settlement of the Keepseagle case, and economic development. President Obama's remarks addressed legal debates involving tribal communities, the Tribal Law and Order Act, access to education, clean energy and Indian owned businesses. He recognized the work that was yet to come, saying, "We’ve got to rebuild America's infrastructure -- from roads to high-speed internet -- that will help connect Native communities to other parts of the country and other parts of the world. Congress needs to expand support for Native American small businesses, because when they’re opening new stores or exporting new goods, then they’re creating new jobs."

=== Fifth conference ===
The Fifth Annual Tribal Nations Conference was held on November 13, 2013. The conference focused on four main areas: justice and tribal sovereignty, increasing economic opportunity, expansion of comprehensive healthcare, and protecting native homelands. In addition to these topics, tribal leaders brought their own concerns to the table, including: the sequestration of Indian treaty dollars, the proposed capping of contract support reimbursements to tribes, Indian education, Federal-tribe energy policies, Indian health issues, and the strengthening of consultations.

=== Sixth conference ===
The Sixth Annual Tribal Nations Conference was held from December 2, 2014 – December 3, 2014, in Washington, D.C. Leaders from the 566 federally recognized American Indian nations were present, along with the President, members of the cabinet, and the White House Council of Native American Affairs. Together, they spoke of issues pertinent to Native American communities, including protection of natural and cultural resources, tribal sovereignty and autonomy, economic development, and health disparities in Native communities. It was during this conference that Obama announced the launch of Generation Indigenous (Gen I), which aims to responsibly create native youth community projects, and a National Tribal Youth Network, which hopes to support leadership development of indigenous youth. In addition to this, the initiative also included the creation of the Cabinet Native Youth Listening Tour, which creates means for native youth to share their concerns and ideas with federal government leaders, and the implementation of a convention for native youth, called the White House Tribal Youth Gathering, to be held on July 9, 2015.

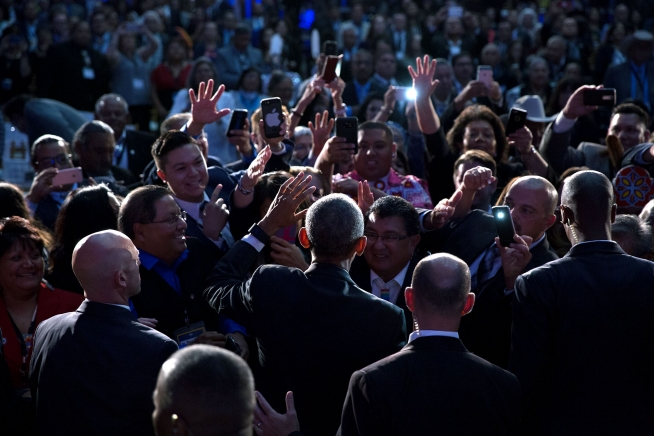
President Obama at the 2016 White House Tribal Nations Conference on September 26, 2016.

== Education ==
The U.S. Department of Education, under the direction of the Obama Administration, and Obama appointee William Mendoza, as executive director of the White House initiative on American Indian and Alaska Native Education, has created policies that seek to address disparities in education that affect Native American and American Indian students. These policies include Executive Order 13592 and the launch of pilot program State-Tribal Education Partnerships (STEP).

=== Executive Order 13592 ===
President Obama signed the Executive order 13592 on December 2, 2011. The executive order, Improving American Indian and Alaska Native Educational Opportunities and Strengthening Tribal Colleges and Universities, was part of Obama's larger educational platform which aims to "improve opportunities and outcomes for the nation's students." The initiative was co-chaired by Arne Duncan and Ken Salazar." Obama's appointee, William Mendoza, a Rosebud tribal member, led the charge.

The order aims to push the leadership of the Bureau of Indian Education (BIE) to the United States Department of Education (DOE), connecting American Indian education initiatives to the resources and expertise of the DOE. The bill seeks to ensure that all American Indian students, despite their institution of choice, have access to support from the federal government. The order authorized the establishment of the Tribal Leaders Task Force and the Federal Interagency Working Group, which aims to create new educational policies to support native youth, and to reform educational policies and programs that affect Native American and American Indian students. Further, the bill pushes for the advancement of American Indian and Alaskan Native early education programs, reform within elementary and secondary schools and higher standards for tribal colleges and universities.

Executive Order 13592 superseded Executive Order 13270 which was ratified by President George W. Bush in 2002. The new order attempts to address the "development challenges endemic to reservation communities by fostering increased levels of human capital accumulation and enterprise development." The bill has been contested by some tribal leaders, who say that the policy will take power from the Bureau of Indian Education by transferring it to the Department of Education. Further, the failure of the No Child Left Behind Act to enhance academic performance as compared to schools under the jurisdiction of the Bureau of Indian Education, has made tribal leaders wary of the increased power of the Department of Education.

=== State-Tribal Education Partnerships ===
In May 2012, the United States Department of Education announced the pilot launch of their program, the State-Tribal Education Partnership (STEP). The program awarded 1.9 million in grants to tribal education agencies. The program aims to bridge gaps between the tribal education agencies and State educational agencies, increasing the voice of tribes in federal education initiatives. In turn, the program aims to create a clear understanding of American Indian and Alaskan Native education needs within State educational agencies to serve Native populations more effectively. The initiative was led by Obama's appointee William Mendoza, a Rosebud tribal member.

=== Tribal Leaders Speak: The State of Education, 2010 ===
In 2010, the United States Department of Education generated the report, Tribal Leaders Speak: The State of Education, 2010. The report was an accumulation of "six official consultations with tribal leaders and American Indian educators across the country in 2010." The compilation included an open letter to tribal leaders by Arne Duncan which explains the Obama Administration's commitment to American Indian and Alaska Native Education. In the report, many tribal leaders expressed concerns that no tangible action would be taken. This was exemplified when Akiak Tribal Chief Ivan M. Ivan asked the administration to "please let us know what the results of all this is because I've been to many of these over 40-some years and, in most cases, nothing happens." The remainder of the report includes outlines of previous research studies, Tribal leader testimonies and summaries and conclusions.

Conclusions of the report included tribal leaders' worries of "lack of opportunities to meaningfully participate in the education of their children." To address this, the tribal leaders advocated for better, comprehensive consultations between American Indian tribes and the federal government that emphasize the sovereignty that tribal nations hold. Another concern brought out by the report is the lack of funding for American Indian serving educational institutions, that have resulted in "subpar school facilities and shortages of qualified teaching personnel" Tribal leaders voiced their recommendation for educational agencies to collaborate with other groups, including health and welfare departments, to ensure that American Indian youth are granted the holistic wellbeing needed to learn efficiently. Further, consultations showed that tribal leaders believe it is the lack of access to educational opportunity that perpetuates the cycles of poverty seen in tribal communities.

== Tribal Law and Order Act of 2010 ==
The Tribal Law and Order Act of 2010 is a bill signed into law by President Barack Obama on July 29, 2010. The law allows tribal courts within Indian country to increase jail sentences handed down in criminal cases. This law aimed to increase the autonomy and efficacy of justice systems within Native communities. This addressed issues of weak law enforcement policies that affected many tribal communities, especially Native women. The act includes an emphasis on the decreasing of violence against Native women.

Previous to the act, tribal courts were limited in their ability to adjust jail sentences handed down in criminal cases, "giving them the impression of a lower, less serious court." This limited the amount of time that tribal courts could sentence defendants to incarceration, including those charged with violence against women.

The act ultimately allows for tribes to hold criminals accountable for their actions, and allows for reservation crimes to be prosecuted in Federal courts. Increased communication between tribal justice systems, federal authorities and the court system are to be put in place.

In addition to the act's aims towards prosecution, it also creates provisions for crime prevention, including the reformation and reinvigoration of alcohol and substance abuse programs for Native communities. In addition to this, it reauthorizes and improves programs that assist and improve outcomes for at-risk Indian youth.

== Health care ==
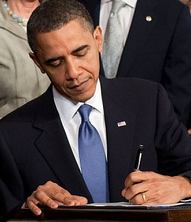
President Barack Obama signing the Patient Protection and Affordable Care Act at the White House.

=== Affordable Care Act ===
Under the Affordable Care Act, American Indian and Alaska Natives have increased options for healthcare insurance. Although those who are eligible can continue to use Indian Health Service, tribal, or urban Indian health insurance programs, or gain coverage through programs such as medicaid and medicare, American Indian and Alaska Natives who belong to Federal Tribes can now also register for qualified health plans under the Affordable Care Act. The Affordable Care Act differentiates Indians in two categories, those belonging to a Federal Tribe and those who do not. Those Native Americans who belong to Federal Tribes have access to a specific healthcare plan at no cost via the Exchanges. Those Native Americans eligible for IHS (Indian Health Service) remain eligible to receive services at their local IHS facilities. . These health plans designated to Federal Tribe Members grant better access to services that insurance from tribal, the Indian Health Service, or urban Indian health programs may not be able to provide.

Due to treaties between different tribes and the United States federal government, those with tribal membership have access to free healthcare, and are not penalized for being uninsured under the Affordable Care Act. These provisions can be difficult to take advantage of for tribe members who do not live on tribal lands, where most tribal-led health facilities are located. In addition to the access issues, due to lack of funding, those whose health issues are seen as lower priority can wait years for treatment. Leaders within Indian Health Service have also stated that if more Native American and Alaska Natives transferred to health plans under the Affordable Care Act, there will be more funds to address other issues, "We’re not funded at the entire need for our population," says Geoffrey Roth, senior advisor to the Director of the Indian Health Service stated, "So we, in many cases, have to prioritize medical needs, and by doing that we’re not able to provide all of the care that individuals need." Further, the expanded insurance options can be used by American Indian and Alaska Natives that move out of state for college, and for those who frequently travel away from tribal lands.

In addition to the sweeping changes that the Affordable Care Act put in place, the act included the Indian Health Care Improvement Act.

=== Indian Health Care Improvement Act ===
The Indian Health Care Improvement Act is a bill signed into law by President Barack Obama on March 23, 2010. The law was part of the Patient Protection and Affordable Care Act. The bill was originally enacted by President Gerald Ford in 1976, which expired in 2000. Obama's reauthorization for the bill has made it permanent. The bill was created in order to address the huge health disparities that affect communities in Indian country. Prior to the passage of the act, tribal leaders, activists, and the National Congress of American Indians had worked for fourteen years in order to make the legislation permanent.

The act authorizes continued and permanent "daily health care delivery to nearly 2 million American Indians and Alaska Natives served by the Indian Health Service (IHS), who are in critical need of improved health care services." The act also authorizes the creation of programs for Indian Health Services that will address the health issues that Native communities face. Programs will include emphasis on addressing issues of mental and behavioral health, home healthcare and assisted living, patient travel costs, healthcare facility construction, dialysis services, referral payments, veteran Indian health concerns, and urban Indian health programs.

=== Tribal Law and Order Act of 2010 ===
In addition to the issues of justice and prosecution that the Tribal Law and Order Act of 2010 addresses, the act also authorized improvement and creation of programs that address alcohol and substance abuse.

== Keystone XL Pipeline ==
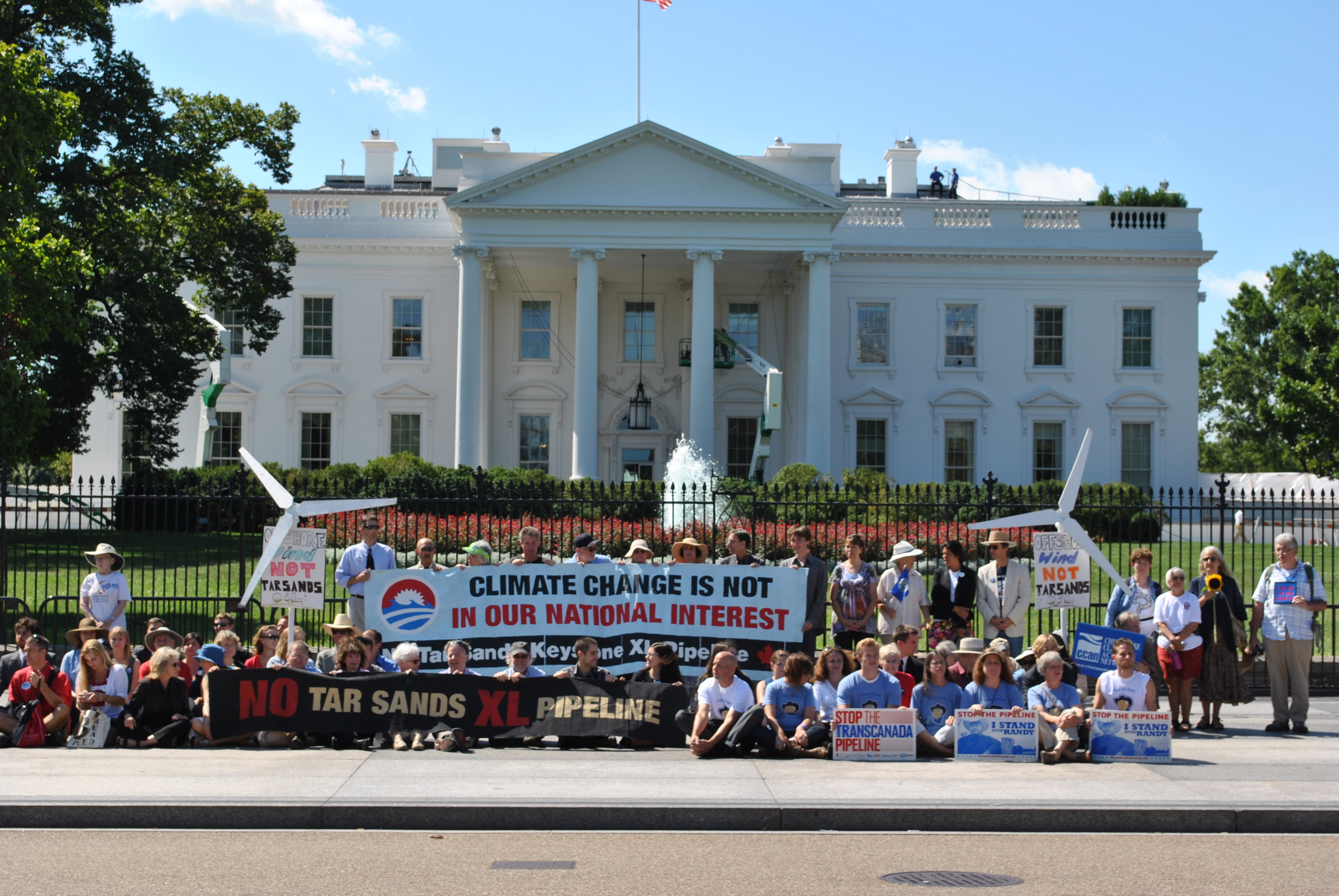
Protests against Keystone XL Pipeline for tar sands at White House, 2011.

The Keystone Pipeline System is an oil pipeline system that runs through Canada and the United States. The project has two complete phases, with a third phase, The Houston Lateral, currently under construction, which is scheduled to be completed in 2015. The fourth and most recent phase of the system, the Keystone XL, was proposed in 2008, and would consist of 526 kilometers of new pipeline. The pipeline would run from Alberta, Canada, where the first Keystone pipeline begins, and run through North Dakota, South Dakota, Nebraska, and Kansas. From Kansas, the oil could be transported through existing Keystone pipeline systems, including the Cushing Extension, and the Gulf Coast Project systems, allowing the oil to be transported as far as Nederland, Texas. Keystone XL Pipeline proponents say that the additional system would "bring essential infrastructure to North American oil producers, but it will also provide jobs, long-term energy independence and an economic boost to Americans." The validity of this claim is not clear. Many Indigenous communities are opposed to the proposed system.

=== Implications for indigenous people ===
Many Native American communities and tribal leaders are opposed to the proposed system, for reasons including increased health hazards, contamination of surface water, and the intrusion and possible destruction of sacred lands and ritual sites. TransCanada's Pipeline Permit Application to the South Dakota Public Utilities Commission cited possible damages that included damage to "prehistoric or historic archaeological sites, districts, buildings, structures, objects, and locations with traditional cultural value to Native Americans or other groups."

On September 2, 2011, American Indian and Canadian Native leaders protested the pipeline in front of the White House, and were arrested. Leaders traveled from across the United States and Canada in order to take a public stance against the pipeline. The aim of the group was to push President Obama to not allow a permit to begin construction on the oil system.

In solidarity with Native American communities, the Dene people of Canada "passed a resolution standing in solidarity with Native Americans and other people opposing the Keystone XL pipeline," said Chief Bill Erasmus, Dene Regional Chief of NWT and representative of the Assembly of First Nations.

=== Legislative reactions ===
On June 30, the United States Senate voted 62 to 36 on a bill that would force Obama's approval of the Keystone XL Pipeline. The United States House of Representatives passed the bill on February 12, 2015. Ten days later, President Obama vetoed the legislation.

Since then, the senate has failed to gain two-thirds vote in order to override the veto of the bill.
