= Hatch Amendment =

Hatch Amendment may refer to:

- The Equal Opportunity to Govern Amendment (2003)
- The Protection of Pupil Rights Amendment (1978)
- Either of two proposed Human Life Amendments:
  - The Hatch Amendment of 1981
  - The Hatch-Eagleton Amendment of 1983
