= Abdul Hassan =

Abdul Hassan may refer to:

- Abdul Hassan (lawyer) (born 1974), born in Guyana
- Abdul Majid Hassan (1380–1408), Sultan of Brunei
