= Public policy of the United States =

Derived from a collection of laws, executive decisions, and legal precedents

The policies of the United States of America comprise all actions taken by its federal government. The executive branch is the primary entity through which policies are enacted, however the policies are derived from a collection of laws, executive decisions, and legal precedents.

== Public development ==
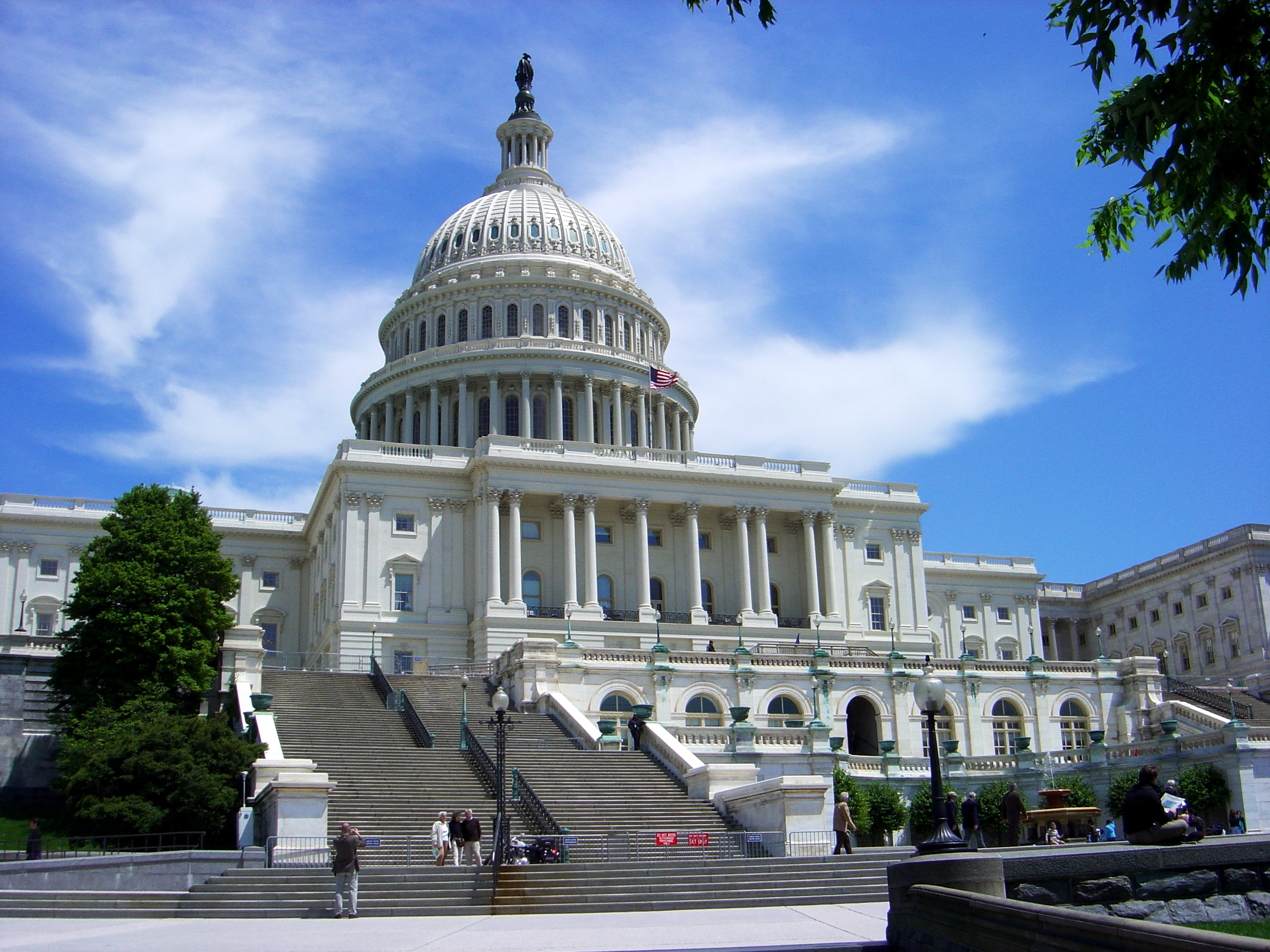
The United States Capitol

The primary method of developing public policy is through the legislative process outlined in Article One of the United States Constitution. Members of the United States Senate and the United States House of Representatives propose and vote on bills that describe changes to the law of the United States. These bills may be created on the initiative of the legislator, or they may take up causes proposed by their constituents. The President of the United States may also suggest legislative policy goals through executive communication, which can then be taken up by members of Congress. Once a bill is introduced by a member of Congress, it is assigned to one or more congressional committees dedicated to that area of policy. The committee evaluates, amends, and sets public hearings for the bill before deciding whether to report favorably on the bill and have Congress vote on it. Once both chambers of Congress vote in favor of a bill, the president may sign it to make it law.

Congress can also develop policy through resolutions, which declare the intent of Congress. Resolutions may be used to amend pending bills, modify Congressional procedure, or to make an official statement. Other ways that Congress can develop public policy include the budgeting process undertaken by the House of Representatives and the power of advice and consent granted to the Senate.

The executive branch of the United States is responsible for enacting and enforcing the policy created by the legislative branch. It also plays a role in the legislative process, as the president plays a role in advocating policies and often has the final say as to whether a bill is vetoed. The Constitution gives the president powers regarding foreign policy and military policy, though these are subject to Congressional oversight.

There are three ways that a president can unilaterally influence policy. An executive order is an instruction given to government agencies and government employees, and these orders have the force of law so long as they comply with the powers granted to the president under the law. A presidential proclamation is an official statement made by the president, and while these do not have force of law, they may announce the use of presidential powers. A presidential memorandum is an informal statement made by the president.

== Agricultural ==
The agricultural policy of the United States is the governing policy for agriculture in the United States and is composed primarily of the periodically renewed federal U.S. farm bills.

In "A New Agricultural Policy for the United States," authors Dennis Keeney and Long Kemp summarize the agricultural policy of the United States as follows: "Because of its unique geography, weather, history and policies, the United States has an agriculture that has been dominated by production of commodity crops for use in animal, industrial and export enterprises. Over time agricultural policies evolved to support an industrialized, commodity-based agriculture. This evolution resulted in farmers leaving the land with agriculture moving to an industrial structure."

== Cultural ==
The cultural policy of the United States funds and preserves American arts and heritage. The United States does not have a comprehensive cultural policy, and cultural aspects are typically governed by the states. The Constitution grants Congress the power to regulate American copyright law, and the arts are supported through the National Endowment for the Arts. American heritage sites, such as parks and historic places, are protected by the National Park Service in the Department of the Interior. Heritage sites of Native American tribes are overseen by the Bureau of Indian Affairs. The Bureau of Educational and Cultural Affairs in the Department of State runs cultural exchange programs with other countries. The Institute of Museum and Library Services oversees federal museum and library policy, including the distribution of grants and facilitation of research. The National Endowment for the Humanities is also responsible for supporting museums and libraries financially. The United States does not govern sports at the federal level, though college athletics are subject to federal education laws.

== Drug policy ==
The drug policy of the United States encompasses the regulation of drugs in the United States and eradication of the illegal drug trade. Since 1971, American drug policy has constituted the war on drugs. The framework of American drug policy was established by the Comprehensive Drug Abuse Prevention and Control Act of 1970, which regulates the production of drugs in the United States and establishes the classes of illicit drugs. Prior to the war on drugs, American drug policy included completely unregulated drugs in the 19th century and a total prohibition on alcohol between 1920 and 1933.

Executive drug policy is coordinated by the Office of National Drug Control Policy (ONDCP). The ONDCP's stated objectives include combating substance use disorder, organizing the National Drug Control Budget, and providing support to law enforcement agencies in combating drug trafficking. The Food and Drug Administration is responsible for regulating consumer and prescription drugs while the Drug Enforcement Administration is responsible for combating the illegal drug trade.

== Economic policy ==
=== Monetary policy ===
The monetary policy of the United States regulates the supply of the United States dollar. Monetary policy is governed by the Federal Reserve Act of 1913. The Federal Reserve is the central bank of the United States and serves as the monetary authority. The Federal Reserve is responsible for regulating government loans and bonds and has the power to set reserve requirements and interest rates. The Department of the Treasury is responsible for the production of coinage and Federal Reserve Notes.

=== Policy responses to the Great Recession ===
The Federal Reserve, Treasury, and Securities and Exchange Commission took several steps on September 19, 2007 to intervene in the Great Recession. To stop the potential run on money market mutual funds, the Treasury also announced on September 19 a new $50 billion program to insure the investments, similar to the Federal Deposit Insurance Corporation (FDIC) program. Part of the announcements included temporary exceptions to section 23A and 23B (Regulation W), allowing financial groups to more easily share funds within their group. The exceptions would expire on January 30, 2009, unless extended by the Federal Reserve Board. The Securities and Exchange Commission announced termination of short-selling of 799 financial stocks, as well as action against naked short selling, as part of its reaction to the mortgage crisis.

== Education policy ==
Congress does not have direct authority over education, and education policy is primarily set by state and local governments. Federal education policy is built around federal funding; the federal government allocates funding for schools, but they must comply with federal regulations to receive it. The Department of Education is responsible for carrying out the federal education policy of the U.S. The earliest federal education policy involved the establishment of schools in federally controlled territory in the 18th century. By the mid-20th century, the federal government had begun providing federal funding for schools.

Elementary and secondary education in the United States is governed by the Elementary and Secondary Education Act (ESEA). This act authorizes the Title I program to provide federal funding for public schools in the United States in order to support underprivileged communities. Several acts have reauthorized and modified the ESEA, including the Improving America's Schools Act of 1994, the No Child Left Behind Act of 2002, and the Every Student Succeeds Act of 2015. Schools that receive federal funding are also subject to the Individuals with Disabilities Education Act, which provides protections for students with disabilities.

== Foreign policy ==
The foreign policy of the United States governs how the American government interacts with the governments of other countries. The president has the power to engage in executive agreements and may negotiate treaties to be ratified by Congress. The Department of State carries out diplomatic activity, and the Department of Defense carries out military activity. The Central Intelligence Agency is the foreign intelligence service of the United States, responsible for the collection and analyzation of national security information from foreign countries. The United States is a member of several international organizations, including the United Nations, NATO, and the Group of Seven, and the World Trade Organization. The United States recognizes all members of the United Nations, and maintains foreign relations with most of them.

American defense policy prioritizes the use of mutually-beneficial alliances to deter attacks against the United States and its allies. As of 2022, the Department of Defense recognizes China as the greatest threat to this cause. The United States also considers Russia, North Korea, Iran, and violent extremist organizations to be major foreign threats. Climate change and pandemics have been recognized as major intangible threats to American security.

During much of the 19th century, American foreign policy was dictated by the Monroe Doctrine, which held Latin America to be the sphere of influence of the United States. Following World War I, President Woodrow Wilson moved away from isolationism toward interventionist Wilsonianism. During the Cold War, American foreign policy focused on combating the spread of Communism. Following the September 11 attacks, the war on terror directed American foreign policy.

== Immigration policy ==
The immigration policy in the United States is set by the United States Congress. The Constitution enumerates the power to regulate naturalization, and the Supreme Court has ruled that the foreign policy powers of Congress extend to immigration regulations. Under the Homeland Security Act of 2002, immigration policy is carried out by the Department of Homeland Security. Customs and Border Protection is responsible for border control, the Immigration and Customs Enforcement is responsible for enforcement of laws against illegal immigration., and the Citizenship and Immigration Services is responsible for processing legal immigration and naturalization.

Naturalization and immigration were historically regulated by a series of Naturalization Acts and Immigration Acts. The Fourteenth Amendment was ratified in 1868, granting birthright citizenship through the Citizenship Clause. The immigration policy of the 19th century was one of open borders, but naturalization was restricted on the basis of race. The Chinese Exclusion Act implemented a ban on immigrants from China in 1882. A quota system was implemented by the Emergency Quota Act of 1921 to limit immigration from different countries. Immigration and naturalization policy was reformed by the Immigration and Nationality Acts of 1952 and 1965. The Refugee Act of 1980 established American asylum policy. The Immigration Reform and Control Act of 1986 and the Illegal Immigration Reform and Immigrant Responsibility Act of 1996 reformed how the United States addresses illegal immigration.

=== Visa policy ===
The United States requires that prospective immigrants or others visitors apply for and be granted a travel visa before entering the United States. Immigrants approved for permanent residency in the United States are granted a green card that indicates their status as lawful permanent residents of the United States. The most common reason for receiving a green card is having a relative that resides in the United States. Other possible reasons include employment in the United States, refugee status, or being selected for the Diversity Immigrant Visa. Visitors seeking temporary residence in the United States, such as for employment or tourism, receive a temporary visa that authorizes residence in the United States for a set period of time.

== Infrastructure policy ==
The Constitution authorizes Congress to develop infrastructure under its authority over interstate commerce and national defense. Early infrastructure policy focused on internal improvements to construct methods of interstate transportation, such as roads and canals. Telecommunications policy is governed by the Communications Act of 1934 and the Telecommunications Act of 1996, and it is overseen by the Federal Communications Commission.

=== Energy policy ===
The energy policy of the United States addresses issues of energy production, distribution, and consumption, such as building codes and gas mileage standards. Federal United States energy policy is governed by energy acts passed by Congress. The Department of Energy is responsible for implementing and overseeing American energy policy. Its stated mission is "to ensure America's security and prosperity by addressing its energy, environmental, and nuclear challenges through transformative science and technology solutions."

Sustainable energy is a priority in modern American energy policy. As of 2019, 80% of energy in the United States comes from fossil fuels. Energy independence is also prioritized by American energy policy. The Strategic Petroleum Reserve was created by the Energy Policy and Conservation Act of 1975, while the Energy Independence and Security Act of 2007 implemented several provisions seeking greater energy independence and energy efficiency. The United States utilizes energy subsidies to facilitate the production of energy and promote a shift to renewable energy sources. In 2016, $10.9 billion in subsidies supported renewable energy, $4.6 billion supported fossil fuel energy, and $2.7 billion went to improvement in energy efficiency.

=== Environmental policy ===
The environmental policy of the United States consists of efforts by the government to limit pollution and climate change in the United States and other countries. The Environmental Protection Agency (EPA) is responsible for overseeing and carrying out American environmental policy. Issues overseen by the EPA include air pollution, climate change, toxic chemicals, sustainability, and water pollution. Major environmental laws in the United States include the Clean Air Act. the National Environmental Policy Act, the Clean Water Act, FIFRA, the Endangered Species Act, the Safe Drinking Water Act, the Hazardous Materials Transportation Act, the Toxic Substances Control Act, and CERCLA.

=== Transportation policy ===
Congress is empowered by the Constitution to regulate interstate commerce through the Commerce Clause and to establish post roads through the Postal Clause. The Department of Transportation is responsible for carrying out transportation policy. The Department of Homeland Security oversees transportation security. Many offices within the Department of Transportation regulate different aspects of transportation, including the Federal Aviation Administration for aviation, the Maritime Administration for maritime transportation, the Federal Railroad Administration for rail, and the Federal Highway Administration for roads.

Early transportation policy in the United States involved the regulation of maritime transportation through admiralty law. As the United States expanded westward in the 19th century, the transcontinental railroad was constructed with oversight by the federal government. The Interstate Commerce Act of 1887 established the foundation of rail policy. The Interstate Highway System was developed in the 1950s to facilitate interstate travel by road.

== Science policy ==
The science policy of the United States directs funding for scientific research and incentivizes research in specific areas. Science policy has direct implications for other fields, including defense policy, energy policy, and health policy. In 2015, $135 billion were allocated to research and development, with nearly half of these funds going to the Department of Defense. Dozens of federal agencies exist for the purposes of research and development. The Office of Science and Technology Policy is responsible for informing the president on scientific issues.

=== Space policy ===
The space policy of the United States involves the civilian and military use of outer space. Civilian space policy is overseen and carried out by the National Aeronautics and Space Administration. The United States Space Force is the outer space division of the United States Armed Forces. The United States is subject to several international treaties that influence its space policy. This include the Outer Space Treaty, which defines international space law and regulates many aspects of activity in outer space. American space policy began to develop in the 1950s when the Space Race began between the United States and the Soviet Union. The policy objective in the 1960s was to undertake a successful Moon landing, which was accomplished by the Apollo 11 mission in 1969. This was succeeded by the Space Shuttle program and participation in the International Space Station.
