= Equal Opportunity to Govern Amendment =

Proposed United States constitutional amendment

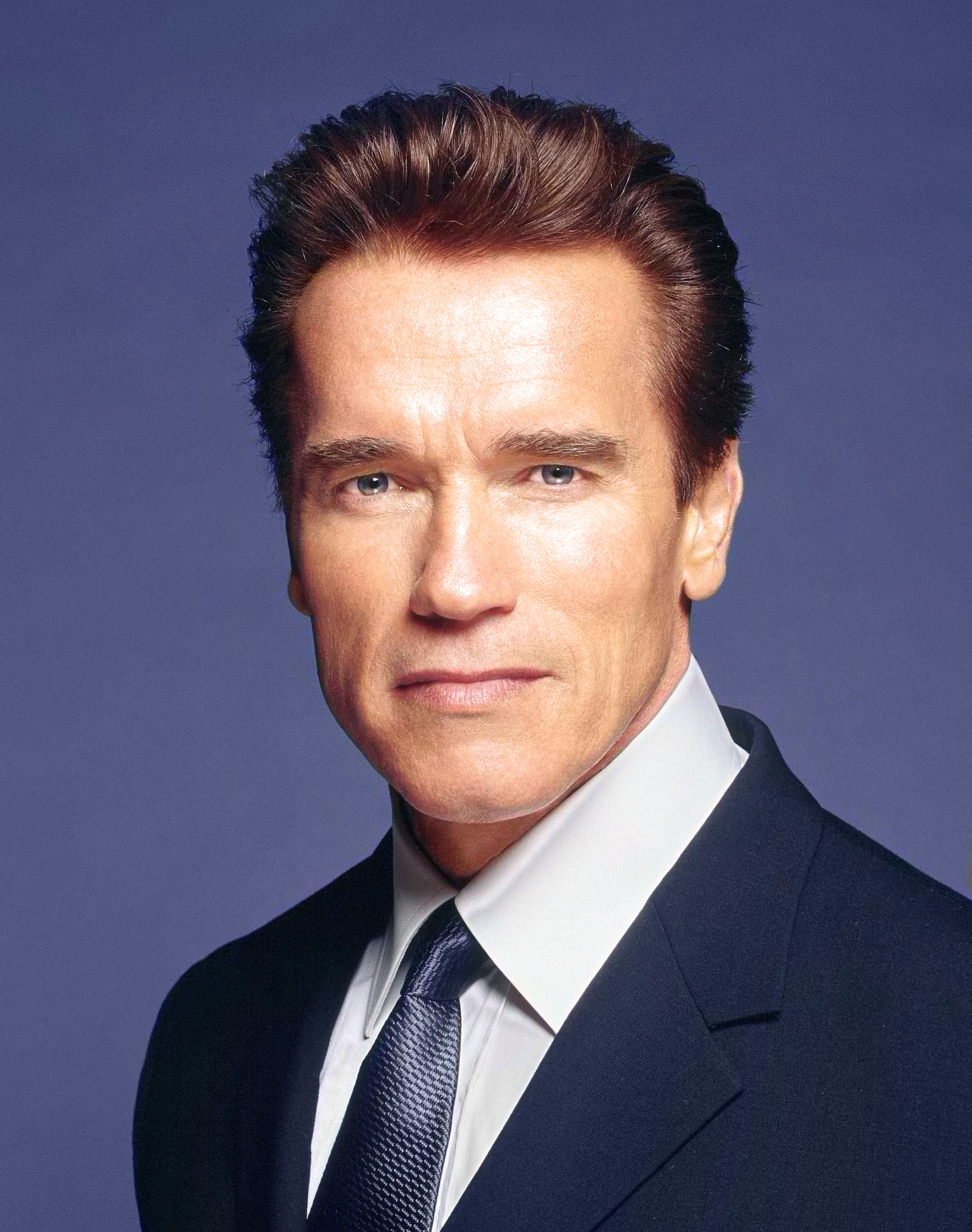
Arnold Schwarzenegger in 2003 during his governorship

The Equal Opportunity to Govern Amendment, also known as the Hatch Amendment or Arnold Amendment, is a proposed United States constitutional amendment that would remove the Constitution's requirement that the president and vice president must be natural-born citizens. It was proposed in July 2003 by senator Orrin Hatch, and would allow naturalized citizens to run for either office when they have been citizens for 20 years. The nickname "Arnold Amendment" is a reference to the Austrian-born Arnold Schwarzenegger, who became a naturalized U.S. citizen in 1983 and subsequently served as the governor of California from 2003 to 2011, as the proposal is widely seen as an overt attempt to make Schwarzenegger eligible for the presidency.

The text of the amendment reads as follows:

Section 1. A person who is a citizen of the United States, who has been for 20 years a citizen of the United States, and who is otherwise eligible to the Office of President, is not ineligible to that Office by reason of not being a native-born citizen of the United States.

Section 2. This article shall not take effect unless it has been ratified as an amendment to the Constitution by the legislatures of three-fourths of the several States not later than 7 years from the date of its submission to the States by the Congress.

The amendment was referred to the Committee on the Judiciary. Hearings were held on October 5, 2004, two months before the end of the second session of the 108th United States Congress, but no further action was taken. Gallup polls from 2003 and 2004 found that a majority of Americans were opposed to the amendment with 28% supporting it and 70% opposing it in 2003 and 31% supporting it and 67% opposing it in 2004.

== See also ==
- Barack Obama citizenship conspiracy theories
- List of fictional United States presidencies of historical figures (S–U) § Arnold Schwarzenegger
- Natural-born-citizen clause (United States) § Eligibility challenges
- United States nationality law
