= Abdul Hassan (lawyer) =

Guyanese-born American lawyer (born 1974)

- Born: 1974 (age 51–52); Guyana
- Occupation: lawyer

Abdul Karim Hassan (born 1974) is a Guyanese-born American labor lawyer in Queens. He is notable primarily for pursuing the right of a naturalized citizen to run for, and for himself declaring he will run for, president of the United States.

In 2012, he filed several lawsuits claiming that the natural-born-citizen clause violated the 5th and 14th Amendments, arguing it was a form of discrimination based on national origin. The argument that the 5th Amendment implicitly repealed the natural-born citizen requirement for the U.S. presidency has previously been advanced in a 2006 law review article by Paul A. Clark.

== Political views ==
He thought that the national debt and budget deficit is the biggest threat to the United States. However, he said "because the national debt and deficit are so large it is impossible to solve the deficit and debt problem with spending cuts and/or tax increases without destroying our way of life. The significant tax increases or spending cuts needed to solve the debt problem would have such a huge negative impact on our standard of living that any politician voting for such measures would be voted out of office."

Under his plan, all budget deficits will be funded by bonds purchased by the Federal Reserve Bank. He said "We will no longer sell bonds to other countries or to Wall Street. If the Federal Reserve holds the bonds the interest paid on those bonds will come back to the United States Treasury instead of going to foreign countries and entities that would otherwise hold the debt."

== Presidential candidacy ==
On July 5, 2011, presidential candidate Abdul K. Hassan asked the United States Federal Election Committee to issue a ruling as to his rights and obligations under the various federal election laws including the Federal Election Campaign Act. After an open meeting on September 1, 2011, during which the issues were intensely deliberated, the FEC unanimously voted (6-0) the next day. The FEC ruled that he can run for president and can solicit and receive contributions. The FEC also ruled that he is covered by FECA and is required to comply with the record-keeping, contribution and expenditure requirements of the FECA but that he is not eligible to receive matching funds. In addition to seeking a ruling from the Federal Elections Commission, presidential candidate Abdul K. Hassan has asked the election authorities in several states for a ruling on whether he would be allowed presidential ballot access as a naturalized citizen. The rulings were sought from the state authorities because even though the presidency is a federal office, ballot access in presidential elections is generally controlled by the states.

== Legal case of Abdul K. Hassan ==
He filed several lawsuits claiming that the natural-born-citizen clause violated the Equal Protection Clause of the 14th Amendment.

- On May 22, 2013, he lost in Hassan v. Montana & Linda McCulloch at the United States Court of Appeals for the Ninth Circuit. The appellate court's opinion, though not published, affirmed the opinion by Senior judge Donald W. Molloy of the lower United States District Court for the District of Montana.
- On November 21, 2012, he lost in Hassan v. Iowa & Matt Schultz at the United States Court of Appeals for the Eighth Circuit. The appellate court's opinion, though not published, affirmed the opinion by Senior judge Ronald Earl Longstaff of the lower United States District Court for the Southern District of Iowa.
- On September 28, 2012, he lost in Hassan v. Federal Election Commission at the United States District Court for the District of Columbia. The district judge Emmet G. Sullivan ruled that the court did not have jurisdiction over the suit and Hassan's appeal to the United States Court of Appeals for the District of Columbia Circuit was denied.
- On September 4, 2012, he lost in Hassan v. Colorado & Scott Gessler at the United States Court of Appeals for the Tenth Circuit. Neil Gorsuch, then a circuit judge, wrote on behalf of a judicial panel that Mr. Hassan was constitutionally prohibited from assuming the presidency and is permitted to be excluded from the Colorado ballot.
- On February 8, 2012, he lost in Hassan v. New Hampshire at the United States District Court for the District of New Hampshire, which is under the United States Court of Appeals for the First Circuit. Judge Joseph A. Diclerico Jr. ruled that because the Natural Born Citizen Clause had not been implicitly repealed by the Equal Protection Clause of the Fourteenth Amendment to the United States Constitution, New Hampshire state laws requiring all presidential candidates to affirm that they are natural born citizens are constitutional.
- On June 21, 2011, he lost in Hassan v. U.S.A. at the United States Court of Appeals for the Second Circuit. The judicial panel, which consisted of Jon O. Newman, Joseph M. McLaughlin, and Debra Ann Livingston, ruled that Hassan "failed to allege with any specificity how the natural born citizen requirement has already injured him or is likely to injure him in the immediate future" and concluded that he "lacks standing".
