= Executive Order 13175 =

US executive order

Executive Order 13175, "Consultation and Coordination with Indian Tribal Governments," was issued by U.S. President Bill Clinton on November 6, 2000. This executive order required federal departments and agencies to consult with Indian tribal governments when considering policies that would impact tribal communities. Executive Order 13175 reiterated the federal government's previously acknowledged commitment to tribal self-government and limited autonomy.

== Background ==
Early treaties established between the United States' government and tribal governments were characterized by provision for the preservation of separate native political and cultural organizations. This notion of self-government established in the treaties, however, was consistently ignored under progressive restrictions on native autonomy. Following concerted efforts by native groups throughout the 1960s and 1970s to reassert their tribal authority, President Richard Nixon marked an official end to Indian termination policy and reintroduced tribal self-government in a 1970 Congressional address. Since then, almost every United States president has reiterated his commitment to reestablishing a government-to-government relationship between federal and tribal governments.

President Clinton's first significant action within Indian policy was his issuance of Executive Order 12875, "Enhancing the Intergovernmental Partnership," in October 1993. This executive order called for a decrease in unfunded mandates and the development of a process for all elected officials, including tribal officials, to provide input on federal policies. On April 29, 1994 President Clinton invited leaders from all 547 recognized tribes to a tribal summit on issues facing tribal communities, the first such summit since James Monroe's presidency. In 1998, Clinton issued Executive Order 13084, which only two years later would be annulled and replaced by the identically titled and similarly purposed Executive Order 13175, "Consultation and Coordination with Indian Tribal Governments."

== Provisions ==
The central provision of Executive Order 13175 is the consultation requirement, as the majority of the order focuses on the imperative of incorporating tribal input into policy decisions.

Executive Order 13175 reiterates certain fundamental principles in tribal policy, including that the United States maintains a unique relationship with tribes as dependent nations. This relationship is governed by the acknowledgement of tribal self-government, sovereignty, and self-determination. In addition to committing the Clinton administration to these principles, Executive Order 13175 establishes standards of behavior for federal agencies and departments when considering, developing, and implementing policies that are anticipated to have significant impact on one or more recognized tribes. These standards include affording tribal governments maximum discretion in implementing federal policies within their communities, defaulting to tribal authority when feasible, and engaging in regular and meaningful consultation with tribal leadership throughout the policy development process.

With regards to this consultation responsibility, Executive Order 13175 requests that all federal agencies and departments develop proposals for how they plan to coordinate with tribal governments. These plans should then be submitted to the Office of Management and Budget for review. In addition, each agency or department is directed to appoint a staff member responsible for ensuring compliance with Executive Order 13175.

== Enforcement ==
President George W. Bush continued to support the ideas behind Clinton's Executive Order 13175, as he issued an executive memorandum entitled "Government-to-Government Relationship with Tribal Governments." In this, Bush recommitted his administration to interacting with tribal governments on a 'government-to government' basis. The memorandum also repeated Executive Order 13175's support of policies that protect tribal sovereignty and right to self-determination.

President Barack Obama also dedicated his administration to the principles outlined in Executive Order 13175. On November 5, 2009, President Obama published a "Memorandum on Tribal Consultation". In this memorandum, President Obama declared that each federal agency or department must submit a plan within 90 days detailing their cooperation with Executive Order 13175.

President Obama's memorandum indirectly acknowledged that Executive Order 13175 had not been consistently and completely adhered to across departments and agencies. One of the reasons for this lack of compliance is that an executive order is difficult to enforce. Executive orders are typically unenforceable unless they are issued following a mandate and they provide private cause of action. The consultation requirement in Executive Order 13175 is not judicially enforceable because it depends on the trust responsibility outlined in the Constitution rather than a statutory mandate and the order explicitly states that it is not intended to create private cause of action.

Full cooperation with Executive Order 13175 is further hindered by the lack of specificity of the order's requirements. While the order states that consultation should be regular and meaningful, it does not clarify at what point in the policy development process this consultation should take place, what communication format should be used for consultation, or how often consultation should take place.

The lack of enforceability and specificity of Executive Order 13175 has resulted in inconsistent compliance with the executive order. For example, in 2003 a proposed reorganization of the Department of the Interior included divorcing the Office of Indian Education Programs from the Bureau of Indian Affairs. This policy would create a new Bureau for Indian Education Programs. Although this would directly impact all recognized tribes, the Department of the Interior did not consult with tribal authorities at any point during the development of the proposed reorganization. Tribal input was finally considered only after a resolution passed by the National Congress of American Indians demanded it. The resulting consultation did not include a complete explanation of the proposed changes, so tribal leadership remained largely unaware of the implications of this reorganization, which included significant funding cuts. This incident was used by legal scholars, advocates, and tribal leaders to indicate that consultation under Executive Order 13175 remained inconsistent and ineffective.

== Response ==
Conceptually, Executive Order 13175 has received little criticism. The principles of self-government, self-determination, and tribal sovereignty have been publicly acknowledged in Indian policy since President Nixon. The idea that consultation is part of the federal government's trust responsibility has been cited since early treaties between federal and tribal governments. Rather, the majority of criticism regarding Executive Order 13175 has concerned a lack of compliance with the order. Tribal leaders have protested that consultation under Executive Order 13175 occurs only when instigated by negative publicity regarding the implementation of policies that did not receive tribal input and consequently harmed tribal communities. In 2008, Representative Nick Rahall restated these concerns as he admonished the Bush administration for prioritizing consultation only after witnessing the disastrous results of the absence of consultation. Executive Order 13175 has also been widely criticized for not providing sufficient guidance to agencies and departments in developing consultation plans.

Derek Haskew, a scholar at the University of Oklahoma College of Law, extended these criticisms of Executive Order 13175. In a 2000 study, he anticipated that the executive order would prove detrimental to the relationship between federal and tribal governments. Haskew argued that because Executive Order 13175 is not enforceable, it creates an uncertain set of benefits for tribal communities and an unclear set of responsibilities for federal agencies and departments. As a result, the executive order established expectations for consultation among tribal communities that would go unmet and so perpetuated a sense of betrayal within the relationship between federal and tribal governments. Haskew concluded his criticism of Executive Order 13175 by acknowledging that the executive order itself was not a product of consultation with tribal leadership.

== See also ==
- Tribal sovereignty in the United States
- Native American self-determination
- Indian Civil Rights Act
