= Naturalization Act of 1790 =

United States federal law

- Other short titles: Naturalization Act
- Long title: An Act to establish a uniform Rule of Naturalization.
- Enacted by: the 1st United States Congress
- Effective: March 26, 1790

Citations
- Public law: Pub. L. 1–3
- Statutes at Large: 1 Stat. 103, chap. 3

Legislative history
- Passed the House of Representatives on March 4, 1790; Passed the Senate on March 19, 1790 with amendment; House of Representatives agreed to Senate amendment on March 22, 1790 with further amendment; Senate agreed to House of Representatives amendment on March 25, 1790; Signed into law by President George Washington on March 26, 1790

Major amendments
- Naturalization Act of 1795

The Naturalization Act of 1790 (1 Stat. 103, enacted March 26, 1790) was a law of the United States Congress that set the first uniform rules for the granting of United States citizenship by naturalization. The law limited naturalization to "free white person(s) ... of good character". This eliminated ambiguity on how to treat newcomers, given that free black people had been allowed citizenship at the state level in many states. In reading the Naturalization Act, some courts also associated whiteness with Christianity and thus excluded Arab Muslim immigrants from citizenship by classifying them as Asians.

Congress modeled the act on the Plantation Act 1740 of the British Parliament (13 Geo. 2. c. 7) that was officially titled An Act for Naturalizing such foreign Protestants and others therein mentioned, as are settled or shall settle in any of His Majesty's Colonies in America, and used its provisions concerning time, oath of allegiance, the process of swearing before a judge, etc.

== Provisions ==
There was a two-year residency requirement in the United States and one year in the state of residence before an alien would apply for citizenship by filing a Petition for Naturalization with "any common law court of record" having jurisdiction over his residence. Once convinced of the applicant's "good character", the court would administer an oath of allegiance to support the Constitution of the United States. The applicant's children to the age of 21 would also be naturalized. The court clerk was to record these proceedings, and "thereupon such person shall be considered as a citizen of the United States".

The act also provided that children born abroad when both parents are US citizens "shall be considered as natural born citizens", but specified that the right of citizenship did "not descend to persons whose fathers have never been resident in the United States". This act was the only US statute ever to use the term "natural born citizen", found in the US Constitution concerning the prerequisites for a person to serve as president or vice president, and the Naturalization Act of 1795 removed the term.

Though the act did not specifically preclude women from citizenship, courts absorbed the common law practice of coverture into the United States legal system. Under this practice, the physical body of a married woman, and thus any rights to her person or property, was controlled by her husband. A woman's loyalty to her husband was considered above her obligation to the state. Jurisprudence on domestic relations held that infants, enslaved persons, and women should be excluded from participation in public life and conducting business because they lacked discernment, the right to free will and property, and there was a need to prevent moral depravity and conflicts of loyalty.

== Afterward ==
The Naturalization Act of 1795 repealed and superseded the 1790 Act. The 1795 Act extended the residence requirement to five years and required that a prospective applicant give notice of three years of application. The Naturalization Act of 1798 extended the residency requirement to 14 years and the notice period to five years. The Naturalization Law of 1802 repealed the 1798 Act, restoring the residency and notice requirements of the 1795 Act.

With the adoption of the Naturalization Law of 1804, women's access to citizenship was increasingly tied to their state of marriage. By the end of the 19th century, the overriding consideration to determine a woman's citizenship or ability to naturalize was her marital status. Starting in 1907, a woman's nationality entirely depended on whether she was married.

The Treaty of Dancing Rabbit Creek, which the US Congress ratified in 1831, allowed those Choctaw Indians who chose to remain in Mississippi to gain recognition as US citizens, the first major non-European ethnic group to become entitled to US citizenship.

Congress made significant changes in citizenship in the 19th century following the American Civil War. The Fourteenth Amendment in 1868 granted citizenship to persons born within the United States and subject to its jurisdiction, irrespective of race, but it excluded untaxed "Indians" (American Indians living on reservations). The Naturalization Act of 1870 extended "the naturalization laws" to "aliens of African nativity and to persons of African descent" while also revoking the citizenship of naturalized Chinese Americans.

Under the Fourteenth Amendment and despite the 1870 Act, the Supreme Court in United States v. Wong Kim Ark (1898) recognized US birthright citizenship of an American-born child of Chinese parents who had a permanent domicile and residence in the United States, and who were there carrying on business, and were not employed in any diplomatic or official capacity under the Emperor of China. US citizenship of persons born in the United States since Wong Kim Ark have been recognized, although the Supreme Court has never directly made a ruling concerning children born to parents who are not legal residents in the United States.

American Indians were granted citizenship in a piecemeal manner until the Indian Citizenship Act of 1924, which gave them blanket citizenship whether they belonged to a federally recognized tribe, though by that date, two-thirds of American Indians had already become US citizens by other means. The Act was not retroactive, so it did not cover citizens born before the effective date of the 1924 Act or outside of the United States as an Indigenous person.

Further changes to racial eligibility for citizenship by naturalization were made after 1940 when Congress extended eligibility to "descendants of races indigenous to the Western Hemisphere", "Filipino persons or persons of Filipino descent", "Chinese persons or persons of Chinese descent", and "persons of races indigenous to India". The Immigration and Nationality Act of 1952 prohibits racial and sex discrimination in naturalization.

== See also ==
- Becoming white thesis
- Definitions of whiteness in the United States

== Bibliography ==
- Isenberg, Nancy (1998). Sex and Citizenship in Antebellum America. Chapel Hill, North Carolina: University of North Carolina Press. ISBN 978-0-8078-4746-6.
- Jefferson, Thomas (1999). Appleby, Joyce; Ball, Terence (eds.). Jefferson: Political Writings. Cambridge Texts in the History of Political Thought. Cambridge, UK: Cambridge University Press. ISBN 978-0-521-64841-7.
- Kerber, Linda K. (1998). No Constitutional Right to be Ladies: Women and the Obligations of Citizenship (1st ed.). New York, New York: Hill and Wang. ISBN 0-8090-7383-8.
