= Naturalization Act of 1798 =

1798 U.S. law making it harder for immigrants to become citizens

- Other short titles: Naturalization Act
- Long title: An Act supplementary to and to amend the act, intituled “An act to establish an uniform rule of naturalization; and to repeal the act heretofore passed on that subject.”
- Enacted by: the 5th United States Congress
- Effective: June 18, 1798

Citations
- Public law: Pub. L. 5–54
- Statutes at Large: 1 Stat. 566, chap. 54

Codification
- Acts amended: Naturalization Act of 1795

Legislative history
- Signed into law by President John Adams on June 18, 1798

The Naturalization Act of 1798 (1 Stat. 566, enacted June 18, 1798) was a law passed by the United States Congress, to amend the residency and notice periods of the previous Naturalization Act of 1795. It increased the period necessary for aliens to become naturalized citizens in the United States from 5 to 14 years and the Declaration of Intention from 3 to 5 years.

Although the law was passed under the guise of protecting national security, most historians conclude it was really intended to decrease the number of citizens, and thus voters, who disagreed with the Federalist Party. At the time, most immigrants supported Thomas Jefferson and the Democratic-Republicans, the political rivals of the Federalists. It had only limited effect, however, as many immigrants rushed to become naturalized before the Act went into effect, and states could at the time make their own more lenient naturalization laws.

The Act was controversial at the time, even within the Federalist Party, as many Federalists feared it would discourage immigration. It was repealed in 1802 by the Naturalization Law of 1802, which restored the residency and notice period of the previous Naturalization Act of 1795.

A number of changes were made to the previous naturalization law:

Act	Naturalization Act of 1790	Naturalization Act of 1795	Naturalization Act of 1798
Notice time	None	3 years	5 years
Residence period	2 years	5 years	14 years

The "notice time" refers to the period that immigrants had to wait after declaring their intent to become a citizen. The "residence period" refers to the period they had to live in the United States before they could become a citizen. The Naturalization Act of 1798 is considered one of the Alien and Sedition Acts, together with three other laws passed contemporaneously in 1798 (the Alien Friends Act, Alien Enemies Act, and Sedition Act). Like the Naturalization Acts of 1790 and 1795, the 1798 act also restricted citizenship to "free white persons".

The act is the first to maintain records of immigration and residence, and provided certificates of residence for white immigrant aliens, for the purpose of establishing the date of arrival for subsequent qualification for citizenship.
