= Naturalization Act of 1802 =

United States federal law

- Long title: An Act to establish an uniform rule of Naturalization, and to repeal the acts heretofore passed on that subject.
- Enacted by: the 7th United States Congress
- Effective: April 14, 1802

Citations
- Public law: Pub. L. 7–28
- Statutes at Large: 2 Stat. 153, chap. 28

Codification
- Acts repealed: Naturalization Act of 1798

Legislative history
- Signed into law by President Thomas Jefferson on April 14, 1802

The Naturalization Act of 1802 (2 Stat. 153, enacted April 14, 1802) was passed by the United States Congress to amend the residency and notice periods of the previous Naturalization Act of 1798. It restored the less prohibitive provisions of the Naturalization Act of 1795, namely reducing the required residency period for aliens to become eligible to be naturalized citizens of the United States, from 14 years to 5, and cutting the Declaration of Intention minimum notice time from 5 years to 3. The 1802 Act replaced the Naturalization Act of 1798, and provided:

- The "free white person" requirement remained in place
- The alien had to declare, at least three years in advance, his intent to become a U.S. citizen.
- The previous 14-year residency requirement was reduced to 5 years.
- Resident children of naturalized citizens were to be considered citizens
- Children born abroad of U.S. citizens were to be considered citizens
- Former British soldiers during the "late war" were barred unless the state legislature made an exception for them
