= Naturalization Act of 1795 =

United States federal law

- Other short titles: Naturalization Act
- Long title: An Act to establish an uniform rule of Naturalization; and to repeal the act heretofore passed on that subject.
- Enacted by: the 3rd United States Congress
- Effective: January 29, 1795

Citations
- Public law: Pub. L. 3–20
- Statutes at Large: 1 Stat. 414, chap. 20

Codification
- Acts repealed: Naturalization Act of 1790

Legislative history
- Signed into law by President George Washington on January 29, 1795

The United States Naturalization Act of 1795 (1 Stat. 414, enacted January 29, 1795) repealed and replaced the Naturalization Act of 1790. The main change made by the 1795 Act from the 1790 Act was the increase in the period of required residence in the United States before an alien can be naturalized from two to five years.

The Act also omitted the term "natural born" in the characterisation of children born outside the US to US citizen parents. The Act repeated the limitation in the 1790 Act that naturalization was reserved only for "free white person[s]." It also changed the requirement in the 1790 Act of "good character" to read "good moral character."

== Pre-1795 ==
Before 1795, naturalization law was governed primarily by the Naturalization Act of 1790.

== Provisions ==
The 1795 Act continued the 1790 Act limitation of naturalization being available only to "free white person[s]." The main change was the increase in the period of required residence in the United States before an alien can be naturalized from two to five years, and the introduction of the Declaration of Intention requirement, or "first papers", which required to be filed at least three years before the formal application, creating a two-step naturalization process.

Aliens intending to naturalize had to go to their local court and declare their intention to do so at least three years before their formal application. In the declaration, the applicant would also indicate his understanding that upon naturalization he would take an oath not only of allegiance to the United States but also of renunciation of his former sovereign. In addition to the declaration of intention and oath of renunciation, the 1795 Act required all naturalized persons to be "attached to the principles of the Constitution of the United States" and be "well disposed to the good order and happiness of the same."

The Act removed the characterization of children born outside the US to US citizen parents as "natural born citizens", providing instead that such children "shall be considered as citizens of the United States".

== Post-1795 ==
The 1795 Act was superseded by the Naturalization Act of 1798, which extended the residency requirement to 14 years and notice period to five years. The 1798 Act was repealed by the Naturalization Law of 1802, which restored the residency and notice requirements of the 1795 Act.
