= Mackenzie v. Hare =

US Supreme Court case regarding citizenship

MacKenzie v. Hare
- Supreme Court of the United States

Argued November 11–12, 1915 Decided December 6, 1915
- Full case name: MacKenzie v. Hare et al., Board of Election of San Francisco
- Citations: 239 U.S. 299 (more) 36 S. Ct. 106

Holding
- The Expatriation Act of 1907 validly dictated that an American women's marriage to a foreign national constituted a voluntary renunciation of her citizenship.

Court membership
- Chief Justice Edward D. White Associate Justices Joseph McKenna · Oliver W. Holmes Jr. William R. Day · Charles E. Hughes; Willis Van Devanter · Joseph R. Lamar; Mahlon Pitney · James C. McReynolds

Case opinions
- Majority: McKenna, joined by unanimous
- Concurrence: McReynolds

Laws applied
- Citizenship Clause and Expatriation Act of 1907
- Superseded by
- Cable Act

Mackenzie v. Hare, 239 U.S. 299 (1915), is a United States Supreme Court case that upheld Section 3 of the Expatriation Act of 1907, which dictated that all American women who voluntarily married a foreign alien renounced their American citizenship. While the statute has since been repealed, this case remains significant because of its precedent that Congress can designate acts which serve as implied voluntary renunciation of one's American citizenship.

== Background ==
The Expatriation Act of 1868 recognized a right for US citizens to renounce their citizenship, rather than being bound by the feudal common law concept of perpetual allegiance to their home country. Section 3 of the Expatriation Act of 1907 dictated that American women would lose their citizenship if they married a foreign alien under the English common law concept of coverture, which deems the legal existence of women merged into their husband upon marriage.

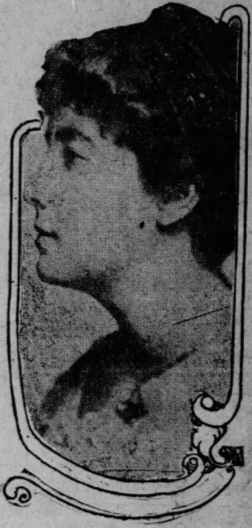
Ethel C. MacKenzie in 1913

In January 1913, after the 1911 California Proposition 4 granted women the right to vote in the state's elections, but before the 1920 Nineteenth Amendment to the US Constitution prohibited sex-based denial of voting rights for US citizens, Ethel C. MacKenzie tried registering to vote in San Francisco, California, the state in which she was born and had always lived within.

The San Francisco Board of Election Commissioners rejected her application because in August 1909, Ethel MacKenzie married Scottish singer Peter Gordon MacKenzie. Since her husband was a British citizen, the marriage was deemed a voluntary renunciation of Ethel MacKenzie's American citizenship under the Expatriation Act of 1907.

MacKenzie unsuccessfully petitioned the California state courts for a writ of mandamus to compel the San Francisco Board of Election Commissioners to accept her voter registration application. After the Supreme Court of California denied MacKenzie's petition in a decision written by then-Associate Justice Lucien Shaw, she appealed its judgement to the Supreme Court of the United States. In her brief, MacKenzie argued that the ongoing World War I conflict highlighted the benefit of tying one's citizenship to their country of residence, rather than basing a women's citizenship on the status of her husband.

== Supreme Court ==
=== Oral arguments ===
During oral arguments held on November 11 and 12, 1915, Ethel MacKenzie's lawyer, Wilbur T. U'Ren, argued that congressional records show that Section 3 of the Expatriation Act of 1907 was only meant to apply to women residing outside the United States. Citing various federal and state court decisions, U'Ren contended that Americans can only renounce their citizenship when they are voluntarily or involuntarily removing themselves from the United States' jurisdiction. Additionally, even if Section 3 applied to MacKenzie, U'Ren claimed that the Citizenship Clause of the Fourteenth Amendment to the US Constitution dictated that the act was void for infringing on her birthright citizenship.

Furthermore, U'Ren cited the Supreme Court's 1856 decision in Dred Scott v. Sandford, which found that the Missouri Compromise's creation of free states that assigned African-Americans rights equivalent to those of White American citizens did not confer implied US citizenship on these Black individuals. Conversely, MacKenzie's act of marriage to an alien could not act as an implied voluntary renunciation of her birthright citizenship.

San Francisco City Attorney Percy V. Long cited the Napoleonic Code and laws of the Netherlands, Ottoman Empire, and Russian Empire to argue that treating marriage as a transfer of allegiance is a widely adopted legal principle. In response, U'Ren argued that the Supreme Court's 1898 decision in United States v. Wong Kim Ark, which found that the international law circumstances of Chinese nationals being subjects of the Emperor of China was irrelevant to upholding the birthright American citizenship of their children born within the United States, should dictate that the international law concerns of alien husbands affecting the allegiance of American women was similarly irrelevant to upholding their birthright American citizenship.

==== Nellie Grant ====
In May 1874, President Ulysses S. Grant's only daughter, Nellie Grant, married British citizen Algernon Sartoris at the White House, and the couple immediately traveled to live in Southampton, England. Pursuant to a May 1870 treaty with the United Kingdom, the United States considered all Americans that became British citizens and resided within British jurisdiction to have voluntarily renounced their American citizenship. Such individuals could only reacquire their American citizenship by returning to live within the United States and reapplying for naturalization. In his December 1876 State of the Union message to Congress, President Grant highlighted "the necessity of legislation concerning the marriages of American citizens contracted abroad, and concerning the status of American women who may marry foreigners." After Algernon Sartoris' 1893 death, Nellie Grant returned to the United States but was ineligible for any of the pathways to reacquire her American citizenship. In honor of her father's military and political service, the 55th United States Congress passed Joint Resolution 36 in May 1889, reestablishing her citizenship.

President Grant's request for Congress to address the citizenship of American women that married foreigners was cited by the San Francisco Board of Election Commissioners as proof that Congress had the authority to designate such marriages as a voluntary renunciation of American citizenship. Conversely, Nellie Grant's case was cited as evidence that the United States only interpreted marriage to an alien husband as a voluntary renunciation of the wife's American citizenship if she resided outside the United States' jurisdiction.

=== Decision ===
In a unanimous decision issued on December 6, 1915, Associate Justice Joseph McKenna rejected all of MacKenzie's arguments, maintaining the Supreme Court of California's denial of her voter registration application. First, McKenna opined that for statutorily unambiguous provisions, courts should ignore arguments for alternative readings based on legislative intent on the assumption that the final text accurately reflects the views of its creators. Second, the Supreme Court held that under the Necessary and Proper Clause, Congress has an implied power to embrace the long-standing legal principle of coverture in its regulation of naturalization. Third, while MacKenzie remained within the United States' borders, voluntarily marrying an alien husband was considered sufficiently analogous to expatriation.

Prior to the Expatriation Act of 1907 explicitly embracing coverture, the Supreme Court had discarded the concept in its jurisprudence. In the 1830 case Shanks v. Dupont, which occurred prior to the 1868 enactment of the Fourteenth Amendment, the Supreme Court ruled that "marriage with an alien, whether friend or enemy, produces no dissolution of the native allegiance of the wife." In a 1901 treatise on the Fourteenth Amendment, West Virginia Supreme Court of Appeals Justice Henry Brannon observed that federal and state courts only interpreted American women marrying aliens as a voluntary renunciation of their citizenship when they resided outside the United States.

=== Concurrence ===
Associate Justice James Clark McReynolds concurred with the judgement but opined that the federal Supreme Court should have dismissed MacKenzie's appeal of the Supreme Court of California's decision because federal courts lacked jurisdiction to address the right to vote in state elections under a state constitutional amendment.

== Aftermath ==
In codifying coverture, Section 4 of the Expatriation Act of 1907 granted American citizenship to the alien wives of American citizens upon marriage. This provision had been interpreted as allowing women stripped of their American citizenship under Section 3 to regain it if their husband underwent naturalization in the United States. In response to the Supreme Court's decision, Ethel MacKenzie urged her husband to apply for American citizenship in March 1916, ultimately regaining her own citizenship through this process.

== Legacy ==
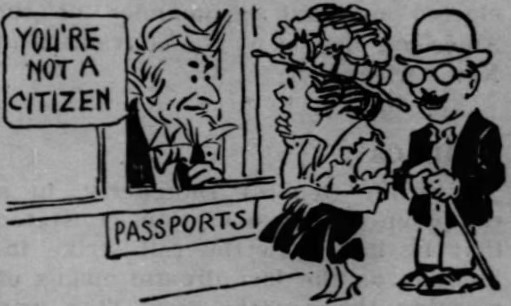
Political cartoon from the Chicago Eagle lampooning the Expatriation Act of 1907, following the 1922 enactment of the Cable Act

Aside from recovery of one's American citizenship under Section 4 of the Expatriation Act of 1907, Section 3 allowed women to reclaim their American citizenship upon the termination of their marriage by either reapplying for citizenship at a United States consulate within one year or residing within the United States. Responding to protests by suffragettes, such as Ethel MacKenzie herself, the 1922 Cable Act amended United States nationality law to dictate that women would retain their citizenship upon marriage to an alien as long as their husband was eligible to become a citizen. Until the Immigration and Nationality Act of 1952, males could be denied citizenship on the basis of their race, and there are still various ideological restrictions on naturalization in American law.

The Supreme Court has repeatedly questioned its verdict in this case, such as its 2017 decision in Sessions v. Morales-Santana, which rejected sex-based differences in the residency requirement for unmarried parents to pass on their American citizenship to children born abroad. In that case, the Supreme Court cited its Mackenzie decision as reflective of "the once entrenched principle of male dominance in marriage," which it considered rejected by its 1979 decision in Caban v. Mohammed striking down such sex-based discrimination under the Fourteenth Amendment's Equal Protection Clause. Similarly, Associate Justice Hugo Black's concurring opinion in Nishikawa v. Dulles regarded the Mackenzie decision as applying principles "inconsistent with the Constitution and cannot be regarded as binding authority."

In its 1958 Perez v. Brownell decision, the Supreme Court cited this case to uphold Section 401 of the Nationality Act of 1940, which considered voting in a foreign election and remaining outside of the United States in wartime to avoid military service as voluntarily renunciations of American citizenship. However, the Supreme Court's 1967 verdict in Afroyim v. Rusk overturned that decision and struck down Section 401, ruling that while such acts suggested a voluntary transfer of allegiance to another country, the Citizenship Clause prevents Congress from expanding the scope of voluntary renunciations of American citizenship beyond actual declarations of expatriation.
