= Citizenship Act =

Type of legislation

A Citizenship Act (or a variant thereof) is a piece of legislation, used to regulate citizenship within a country.

Many countries have, or have had, laws bearing the name.

== List of Citizenship Acts ==
- Australia: Australian Citizenship Act 1948, replaced by the Australian Citizenship Act 2007
- Bhutan:
  - Bhutanese Citizenship Act 1958
  - Bhutanese Citizenship Act 1985
- Canada:
  - Canadian Citizenship Act, 1946
  - Canadian Citizenship Act, 1977
- India: Citizenship Act, 1955
- Ireland: there have been several Irish Nationality and Citizenship Acts in Irish nationality law
- New Zealand: British Nationality and New Zealand Citizenship Act 1948
- Slovakia: Citizenship Act (Slovakia)
- South Africa: Bantu Homelands Citizenship Act, 1970, subsequently renamed the Black States Citizenship Act, 1970, and repealed in 1994
- Sri Lanka (Ceylon): Ceylon Citizenship Act, 1948
- United Kingdom: Nationality and Citizenship Act 1948
- United States:
  - Indian Citizenship Act, 1924
  - Child Citizenship Act of 2000
  - Citizenship Reform Act of 2005 (not passed)
  - US Citizenship Act of 2021 (not passed)
