= Victor Papanek =

Austrian-American designer (1923–1998)

Victor Joseph Papanek
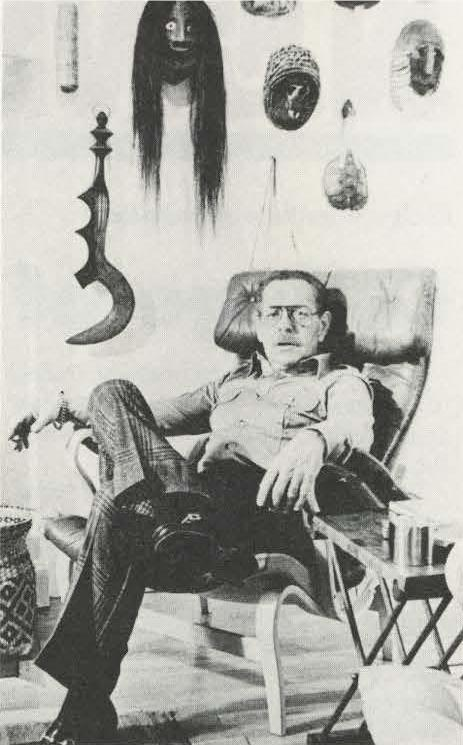
- Papanek circa 1981
- Born: Victor Josef Papanek; 22 November 1923; Vienna, Austria
- Died: 10 January 1998 (aged 74); Lawrence, Kansas U.S.
- Other name: Victor Joseph Papanek
- Education: Cooper Union; Massachusetts Institute of Technology
- Occupations: professor, author
- Known for: design theory
- Spouses: Harlanne Herdman (m. 1966; div. 1989) Winifred N. Nelson (m. 1951; div. 1957) Ada M. Epstein (m. 1949; div. 1950) Anna Lipschitz (m. 1944, divorced)
- Children: 2

Victor Josef Papanek (German pronunciation: [ˈvɪktoʁ ˈjoːsɛf ˈpapanɛk]; 22 November 1923 – 10 January 1998) was an Austrian-born American designer and educator, who became a strong advocate of the socially and ecologically responsible design of products, tools, and community infrastructures. His book Design for the Real World, originally published in 1971 and translated into more than 24 languages, had lasting international impact.

== Early life ==
Victor Josef Papanek was born in Vienna, Austria, on 22 November 1923. There have been conflicting published information on Papanek's birth date, and the dates range between 1923 and 1927. His mother was Helene (née Spitz) and his father was Richard Papanek, a Jewish deli owner. Victor was born during a time in Austria when it was a Social Democratic led state. He attended school in England. His father died in 1935, while serving in the French Army.

In 1939, following Nazi Germany's annexation of Austria, 15-year-old Papanek emigrated to the United States via Ellis Island as a refugee. In 1940, he taught German lessons at the New York YMCA.

Upon arrival to New York City, the 1939 New York World's Fair was happening, which included work by Raymond Loewy. This shaped some of Papanek's early ideas on design as a form of democracy. In the late 1940s, Papanek created his first New York City-based design consultancy called, Design Clinic.

== Education ==
Papanek studied architecture with Frank Lloyd Wright at Taliesin West in Arizona in 1949. Papanek earned his bachelor's degree at Cooper Union in New York (1950) and completed graduate studies in design at the Massachusetts Institute of Technology (M.A. 1955).

The Berlin emigre Paul Zucker had a significant influence on Papanek during his studies at Cooper Union.

== Career ==
Papanek created product designs for the United Nations Educational, Scientific and Cultural Organization (UNESCO) and the World Health Organization (WHO). Volvo of Sweden contracted design work with him, in order to create a taxi for the disabled.

He worked with a design team that prototyped an educational television set that could be utilized in the developing countries of Africa and produced in Japan for $9.00 per set (cost in 1970 dollars).

His designed products also included a remarkable transistor radio, made from ordinary metal food cans and powered by a burning candle, that was designed to actually be produced cheaply in developing countries. His design skills also took him into projects like an innovative method for dispersing seeds and fertilizer for reforestation in difficult-to-access land, as well as working with a design team on a human-powered vehicle capable of conveying a half-ton load, and another team to design a very early three-wheeled, wide-tired all-terrain vehicle.

Papanek received numerous awards, including a Distinguished Designer fellowship from the National Endowment for the Arts in 1988. The following year in 1989, he received the IKEA Foundation International Award.

=== Ideology and pedagogy ===
Papanek's ideas on iconoclastic design, journalism, and his unique global approach to pedagogic initiatives was a radical shift away from the existing design movements of the 1960s and 1970s. His perception of design was of an object or system, specifically working as a political tool. With his interest in all aspects of design and how design affected people and the environment, Papanek felt that much of what was manufactured was inconvenient, often frivolous and even unsafe. His book "Design for the Real World" (1971), outlined many of these ideas.

=== Teaching ===
Throughout most of his career, Papanek taught design courses. He was an associate professor and the Head of the Department of Product Design in the School of Design at North Carolina State College (1962). Additionally, Papanek taught at the Ontario College of Art, the Rhode Island School of Design, Purdue University, the California Institute of the Arts (where he was dean), Kansas City Art Institute (from 1976 to 1981), University of Kansas (J.L. Constant Professor of Architecture and Design, 1982–1998), and other places in North America, Europe and elsewhere.

== Death and legacy ==
Papanek died on January 10, 1998, in Lawrence, Kansas, aged 74.

The Victor J Papanek Social Design Award was created as a joint venture between the Papanek Foundation, the University of Applied Arts Vienna, the Museum of Arts and Design and the Austrian Cultural Forum, to give an award to designed “projects that upheld Papanek’s vision of environmental and/or social responsibility”.

In 2015, the Parsons School of Design and the Victor Papanek Foundation of the University of Applied Arts Vienna held a symposium and exhibition, How Things Don’t Work: The Dreamspace of Victor Papanek.

In 2018–2021, the Vitra Design Museum and the Victor Papanek Foundation of the University of Applied Arts Vienna held a posthumous solo exhibition, Victor Papanek: The Politics of Design.

== Personal life ==
Papanek was married four times and had two daughters. His last spouse was Harlanne Herdman (married from 1966 to 1989, divorced), together they had one daughter. Winifred N. Nelson Higginbotham (married from 1951 to 1957, divorced), together they had one daughter. He often referred to Winifred as his first wife, even though she was not, and the last name "Higginbotham" was from Winifred's first marriage. His first two wives were of Russian-Jewish ethnicity from Brooklyn, Ada M. Epstein (married from 1949 to 1950, divorced) and Anna Lipschitz (married from 1944, divorced).

In June 1945, Papanek became a naturalized citizen of the United States.

== Bibliography ==
=== Books authored by Papanek ===
- Papanek, Victor (1971). Design for the Real World: Human Ecology and Social Change. New York: Pantheon Books. ISBN 0-394-47036-2.
- Papanek, Victor; Hennessey, Jim (1973). Nomadic Furniture: How to Build and Where to Buy Lightweight Furniture That Folds, Collapses, Stacks, Knocks-Down, Inflates or Can be Thrown Away and Re-Cycled. New York: Pantheon Books. ISBN 0-394-70228-X.
- Papanek, Victor; Hennessey, Jim (1974). Nomadic Furniture 2. New York: Pantheon Books. ISBN 0-394-70638-2.
- Papanek, Victor; Hennessey, Jim (1977). How Things Don't Work. New York: Pantheon Books. ISBN 0-394-49251-X.
- Papanek, Victor (1983). Design for Human Scale. New York: Van Nostrand Reinhold. ISBN 0-442-27616-8.
- Papanek, Victor (1995). The Green Imperative: Natural Design for the Real World. New York: Thames and Hudson. ISBN 0-500-27846-6.

=== Books about Papanek ===
- Clarke, Alison J. (2021). Victor Papanek: Designer for the Real World. Cambridge Massachusetts: MIT Press. ISBN 978-0-2620449-4-3.
- Kries, Mateo; Klein, Amelie; Clarke, Alison J., eds. (2018). Victor Papanek: The Politics of Design. Weil am Rhein, Germany: Vitra Design Museum and Victor Papanek Foundation. ISBN 978-3-9458522-6-2.
- Fineder, Martina; Geisler, Thomas; Hackenschmidt, Sebastian (2017). Nomadic Furniture 3.0 – Neues befreites Wohnen? / New Liberated Living? (in English and German). Niggli. ISBN 978-3-721209617.
- Gowan, Al (2015). Victor Papanek: Path of a Design Prophet. Cambridge Massachusetts: Merrimack Media. ISBN 978-1-939166-72-2.
