= Henry Brannon =

American judge (1837–1914)

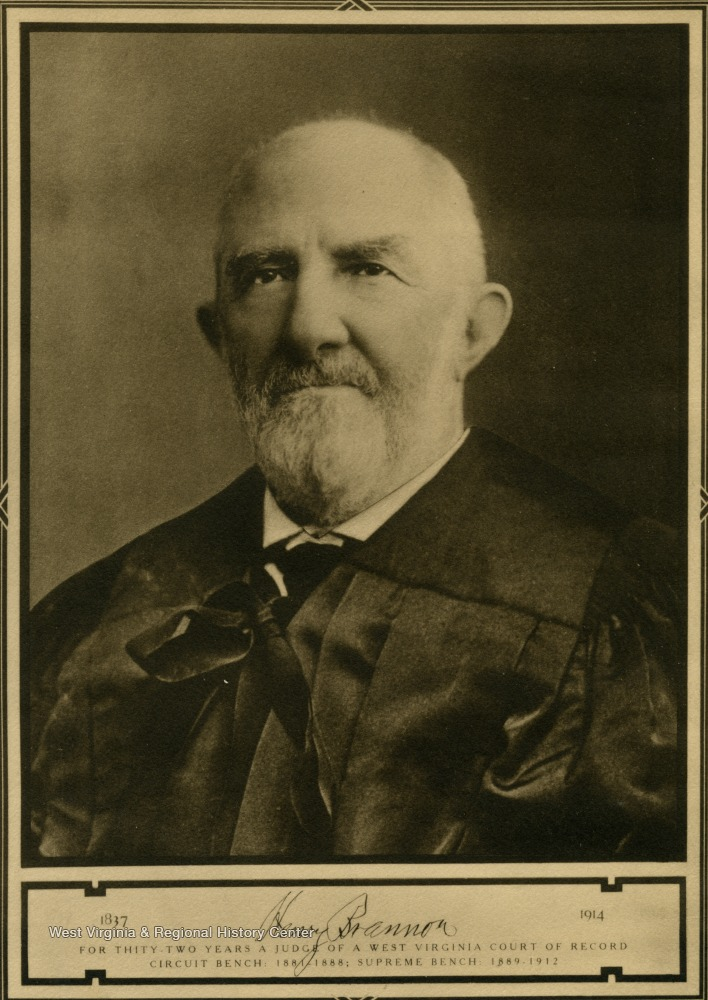

Justice of the West Virginia Supreme Court of Appeals
- In office January 1889 – December 1912
- Preceded by: Okey Johnson
- Succeeded by: Charles W. Lynch

Personal details
- Born: November 26, 1837 Winchester, Virginia
- Died: November 24, 1914 (aged 76) Weston, Virginia
- Party: Democratic (before 1900); Republican (1900–1914)
- Education: University of Virginia

Henry Brannon (November 26, 1837 – November 24, 1914) was a justice of the Supreme Court of Appeals of West Virginia from January 1, 1889, to December 31, 1912.

== Early life, education, and career ==
Born in Winchester, Virginia, Brannon graduated from the University of Virginia in 1858. He thereafter moved to Weston, Virginia, reading law to gain admission to the bar in 1859. He was elected prosecuting attorney of Lewis County, Virginia, in 1860. In 1871, he represented the county in the West Virginia House of Delegates, and in 1880, he was elected to a seat on the West Virginia eleventh judicial circuit, succeeding his own older brother, John Brannon.

== Judicial service and later life ==
In 1888, Brannon was elected to a twelve-year terms on the state supreme court, taking office the following January. Initially a Democrat, Brannon ran as a Republican in his successful 1900 reelection campaign.

During his tenure, Brannon frequently clashed with fellow West Virginia Supreme Court of Appeals Justice Marmaduke H. Dent, as Brannon preferred to rely on precedent and laissez-faire economic principles in his jurisprudence.

In 1901, Brannon published A Treatise on the Rights and Privileges Guaranteed by the Fourteenth Amendment to the Constitution of the United States, which cataloged how each clause of the amendment had been interpreted by state and federal courts following its 1868 enactment. While Brannon's treatise has been frequently cited in US Supreme Court cases like Mackenzie v. Hare, it was criticized for minimally analyzing whether dominant interpretations were potentially flawed.

Following his service on the court, he returned to private practice until his death. Brannon died in Weston, West Virginia, at the age of 77, having argued a case before the circuit court the previous day, and complained of feeling ill afterwards. His wife having died several years earlier, he was survived by a son and four daughters.

Political offices
Preceded by Okey Johnson	Justice of the Supreme Court of Appeals of West Virginia; 1889–1912	Succeeded by Charles W. Lynch
