= Expatriation Act of 1868 =

- Long title: An Act concerning the Rights of American Citizens in foreign States
- Enacted by: the 40th United States Congress
- Effective: July 27, 1868

Citations
- Statutes at Large: 15 Stat. 223

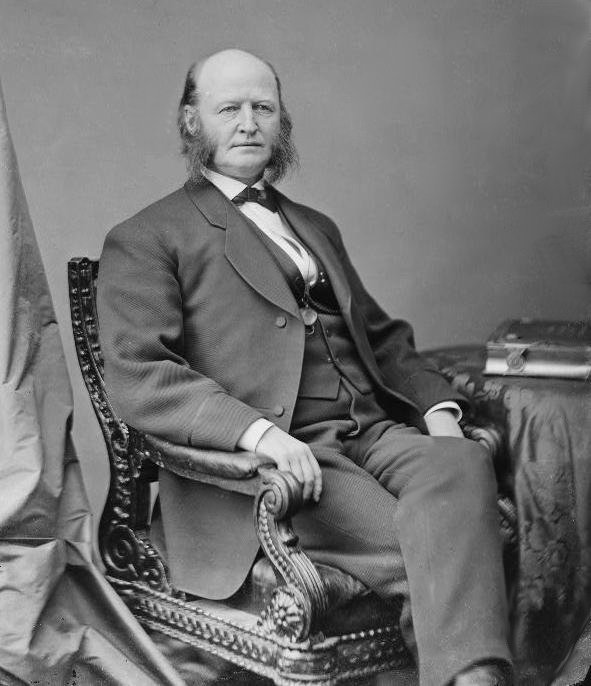
Frederick E. Woodbridge was a major proponent of the Expatriation Act of 1868

The Expatriation Act of 1868 was an act of the 40th United States Congress that declared, as part of the United States nationality law, that the right of expatriation (i.e. a right to renounce one's citizenship) is "a natural and inherent right of all people" and "that any declaration, instruction, opinion, order, or decision of any officers of this government which restricts, impairs, or questions the right of expatriation, is hereby declared inconsistent with the fundamental principles of this government".

The intent of the act was also to counter claims by other countries that U.S. citizens owed them allegiance, and was an explicit rejection of the feudal common law principle of perpetual allegiance.

The Expatriation Act of 1868 was codified at 25 Rev. Stat. § 1999, and then by 1940 had been re-enacted at 8 U.S.C. § 800. It is now the last note to 8 U.S.C. § 1481.

== Background ==
The United States had, since its early days, implicitly denied the doctrine of perpetual allegiance through its naturalization laws. President Thomas Jefferson wrote to Treasury Secretary Albert Gallatin that "I hold the right of expatriation to be inherent in every man by the laws of nature … the individual may [exercise such right] by any effectual and unequivocal act or declaration".

Other countries, however, did not recognise this position; indeed, the British Royal Navy's impressment of American sailors was one of the casus belli provoking the U.S. to join the War of 1812. Those countries' non-recognition of renunciation of their citizenship continued to cause problems for naturalized Americans during the course of the century. In the 1860s, France as well as various German and Scandinavian states attempted to conscript their natives who had become U.S. citizens when they went back to their homelands for short visits. France, Italy, and Switzerland however at least had procedures for abjuring one's original allegiance; Greece, Russia, and the Ottoman Empire did not have such procedures at all, and even sometimes punished their natives for acquiring U.S. citizenship.

In response to this, President Andrew Johnson called on Congress in his Second Annual Message in December 1866 to assert "the principle so long maintained by the executive department that naturalization by one state fully exempts the native-born subject of any other state from the performance of military service under any foreign government". The problem was illustrated more acutely the following year when Britain charged naturalized Americans John Warren and Augustine Costello of the Fenian Brotherhood under the Treason Felony Act 1848. Johnson used this example to illustrate the urgency of the problem in his Third Annual Message in December 1867, stating that it "perplexes the public mind concerning the rights of naturalized citizens and impairs the national authority abroad".

== Debate and enactment ==
In January 1868, the month after Johnson's Third Annual Message, the House Committee on Foreign Affairs issued a report on nationality issues; their report argued against the doctrine of perpetual allegiance, stating that countries which permitted emigration implicitly recognized the right to renounce one's citizenship as well. Nathaniel P. Banks, head of the committee, introduced the bill that would become the Expatriation Act on that same day. One of the bill's major proponents was Frederick E. Woodbridge of Vermont. The initial version of the bill had harsh provisions for retaliation against the countries which refused to recognize the right to renounce one's citizenship; for example, if an American was arrested by his native country, the bill would have given the president the power to order the arrest of any of the subjects of that country living in the United States. An amendment added the preamble; the bill as amended was adopted in the House by a vote of 104 to 4. The bill then came before the Senate Committee on Foreign Relations; the major amendment in the Senate was to ensure that the retaliatory measures taken by the president would be limited to those "not amounting to acts of war". The Senate passed the amended bill 39–7; the amended bill was concurred in by the House.

The Expatriation Act came into law one day before the Fourteenth Amendment, which introduced the principle of birthright citizenship into the Constitution. The attitude towards emigration and loss of citizenship expressed in the Expatriation Act of 1868 was echoed by the contemporaneous Burlingame Treaty between the United States and China's Qing dynasty, which stated that both signatory parties recognized "the inherent and inalienable right of man to change his home and allegiance, and also the mutual advantage of ... free migration and emigration ... for purposes of curiosity, of trade, or as permanent residents". Other migrant-sending countries also moved towards the principle of recognition of renunciation of citizenship as well, for example through the Bancroft Treaties. By the late nineteenth century, the doctrine of perpetual allegiance had died a "surprisingly speedy and unlamented death".

== Loss of United States citizenship under the Act ==
=== Early policies ===
The Expatriation Act of 1868 did not explicitly create any procedure by which a U.S. citizen might exercise his or her right to give up citizenship. Existing law — namely, the Enrollment Act of 1865 § 21 — provided only two grounds for loss of citizenship, those being draft evasion and desertion. The Bancroft Treaties also had provisions that naturalized U.S. citizens would be deemed to have renounced their U.S. citizenship and resumed their original citizenship if they returned to their native countries and remained there for a certain period of time. Finally, in 1873, Attorney-General George Henry Williams wrote that "the affirmation by Congress, that the right of expatriation is 'a natural and inherent right in all people' includes citizens of the United States as well as others, and the executive should give to it that comprehensive effect." However, William's statement was mostly used to justify the denaturalization of naturalized U.S. citizens. In general, a naturalized American who took up a position in the government or military of his native country was considered to have given up his U.S. citizenship and resumed his original one; however, naturalized Americans who did these same acts in other countries which were not their native countries were seen as having given up their right to U.S. protection, but not to U.S. citizenship itself. In particular, the State Department did not consider that mere establishment of non-U.S. domicile was sufficient grounds for revoking U.S. citizenship.

There would be no legislation regarding grounds for loss of U.S. citizenship by native-born citizens until the Expatriation Act of 1907 (34 Stat. 1228). Before then, the State Department and the courts seemed to agree that the only act which would cause a native-born citizen to lose U.S. citizenship was voluntary acquisition of citizen or subject status in a foreign state. Even foreign military service was not necessarily held to result in loss of U.S. citizenship; the precedent pointed out by Thomas F. Bayard, Secretary of State during the late 1880s, was that the U.S. did not consider the French who joined the American Revolution to have thus acquired U.S. citizenship. Similarly, voting in a foreign election was not held as definitive evidence of intent to give up citizenship, in the absence of an express acquisition of foreign citizenship and renunciation of the U.S. one. However, the Expatriation Act of 1907 and subsequent legislation would thenceforth broaden the number of actions which, if undertaken voluntarily, would be considered by the U.S. government to prove the intent to lose U.S. citizenship.

=== Later case law ===
In the 1950 case Savorgnan v. United States, the Supreme Court held that a woman who applied for Italian citizenship by virtue of her marriage to her husband had voluntarily given up her U.S. citizenship. Associate Justice Harold Hitz Burton wrote that:

Traditionally the United States has supported the right of expatriation as a natural and inherent right of all people. Denial, restriction, impairment or questioning of that right was declared by Congress, in 1868, to be inconsistent with the fundamental principles of this Government. From the beginning, one of the most obvious and effective forms of expatriation has been that of naturalization under the laws of another nation. However, due to the common-law prohibition of expatriation without the consent of the sovereign, our courts hesitated to recognize expatriation of our citizens, even by foreign naturalization, without the express consent of our Government. Congress finally gave its consent upon the specific terms stated in the Citizenship Act of 1907 and in its successor, the Nationality Act of 1940. Those Acts are to be read in the light of the declaration of policy favoring freedom of expatriation which stands unrepealed.

And, in his footnote:

The above language [i.e. the preamble of the Expatriation Act, which he quoted], when enacted, was intended to apply especially to immigrants into the United States. It sought to emphasize the natural and inherent right of such people to expatriate themselves from their native nationalities. It sought also to secure for them full recognition of their newly acquired American citizenship. The language is also broad enough to cover, and does cover, the corresponding natural and inherent right of American citizens to expatriate themselves.

In the 1957 case Briehl v. Dulles, the Court of Appeals for the DC Circuit held that the Department of State could lawfully deny issuance of a United States passport to an applicant who refused to execute an affidavit regarding his political affiliations. However, in a dissenting opinion, Judge David L. Bazelon argued that "[s]ince expatriation is today impossible without leaving the country, the policy expressed by Congress in 1868 and never repealed precludes a reading of the passport and travel control statutes which would permit the Secretary of State to prevent citizens from leaving". Chief Judge Henry White Edgerton concurred with Bazelon's opinion.

Congress's power to legislate for implicit expatriation of Americans was later heavily restricted by the 1967 case Afroyim v. Rusk, which concluded that natural-born Americans cannot be deprived of citizenship by any means except a voluntary renunciation in the presence of a consular official. Associate Justice Hugo Black's majority opinion extensively discussed the Expatriation Act of 1868, including the history of proposed amendments to it.

== See also ==
- Image of the Expatriation Act of 1868

== Bibliography ==
- Erler, Edward J. (2003). "From subjects to citizens: the social compact of origins of American citizenship". In Pestritto, Ronald J.; West, Thomas G. (eds.). The American Founding and the Social Compact. Lexington Books. OCLC 51726670.
- Guild, Elspeth (2005). "Dual Nationality". In Gibney, Matthew J.; Hansen, Randall (eds.). Immigration and Asylum: From 1900 to the Present. ABC-CLIO. ISBN 9781576077962. OCLC 163428124.
- Pickus, Noah (2007). True Faith and Allegiance: Immigration and American Civic Nationalism. Princeton University Press. OCLC 335103634.
- Rice, Daniel (2011). "The 'Uniform Rule' and its exceptions: a history of Congressional naturalization legislation" (PDF). Ozark Historical Review. 40. Archived from the original (PDF) on 2013-03-05.
- Schuck, Peter H.; Smith, Rogers M. (1985). Citizenship Without Consent: Illegal Aliens in the American Polity. Yale University Press. OCLC 12189475.
- Tsiang, I-Mien (1942). The question of expatriation in America prior to 1907. Johns Hopkins Press. OCLC 719352.
- Yoo, John C. (2002-06-12). "Survey of the Law of Expatriation: Memorandum Opinion for the Solicitor General". Department of Justice. Archived from the original on June 3, 2006.
- "7 FAM 1200, Appendix A: Loss of Nationality and the Early Years of the Republic". Foreign Affairs Manual. United States Department of State. 2009.
