= Charles W. Lynch =

American judge (c. 1851–1932)

Charles Wesley Lynch (March 11, 1851 – September 9, 1932) was a West Virginian politician and judge, serving as a justice of the Supreme Court of Appeals of West Virginia from January 1, 1913, until his retirement December 31, 1921.

Born near South Clarksburg, Virginia, Lynch received a B.A. from West Virginia University in 1874, followed by an A.M. from the same institution in 1877. He received a law degree from West Virginia Wesleyan College.

Lynch was elected to the West Virginia House of Delegates in 1882, and again in 1890. In 1904, he was elected as a Republican to serve as a judge of the West Virginia thirteenth judicial circuit, and in 1912 was elected to the state supreme court. He served as chief justice for a time, resigning from the court in 1921.

Lynch died at the age of 81, at which time he was considered "the dean of the Harrison county bar".

Political offices
Preceded by Henry Brannon	Justice of the Supreme Court of Appeals of West Virginia; 1913–1921	Succeeded by James A. Meredith
