= Carlisle v. United States =

- Supreme Court of the United States

Argued April 3, 1873 Decided April 14, 1873
- Full case name: Carlisle v. United States
- Citations: 83 U.S. 147 (more) 16 Wall. 147; 21 L. Ed. 426

Holding
- Subjects of the Queen of Great Britain who had been residents within the United States prior and during the American Civil War and provided support to the Confederate States of America were unconditionally and without reservation pardoned by Proclamation 179 and were allowed to make a claim and recover the proceeds for merchandise confiscated during the war. The opinion of the United States Court of Claims reversed.

Court membership
- Chief Justice Salmon P. Chase Associate Justices Nathan Clifford · Noah H. Swayne; Samuel F. Miller · David Davis; Stephen J. Field · William Strong; Joseph P. Bradley · Ward Hunt

Case opinion
- Majority: Field, joined by Chase, Clifford, Swayne, Miller, Davis, Strong, Bradley, Hunt

Carlisle v. United States, 83 U.S. (16 Wall.) 147 (1872), was a United States Supreme Court case in which the Court ruled, "The alien, whilst domiciled in the country, owes a local and temporary allegiance, which continues during the period of his residence." The case has been cited in articles discussing the "culture defense" in criminal law.

== Statement of the case ==
Prior to the American Civil War, the claimants were subjects of the Queen of Great Britain but had been residents in the United States prior and during the war. In December 1861, the claimants began to manufacture saltpeter, an ingredient of gunpowder, in Santa Cave, a cave 7 miles (11.25 km) southwest of Scottsboro, Alabama. During the war, the saltpeter was sold to the Confederate States military. In 1864, the Union Army in a campaign through Alabama, seized 65 bales of cotton that were valued at $43,232 and stored on the claimant's plantation. On December 25, 1868, after the Confederate government surrendered, US President Andrew Johnson issued Proclamation 179, which unconditionally and without reservation pardoned and provided amnesty to all those who had supported the Confederate government. After the pardon, the claimants attempted to recover from the US government the proceeds of the 65 bales of cotton.

== Court opinion ==
When the claimants presented their claim after the pardons, the United States Court of Claims denied the request proclaiming that the United States government had the right to confiscate the bales of cotton because the claimants gave aid and comfort to the rebellion, and for that reason were not entitled to recover the proceeds of the cotton seized. However, in a unanimous decision, the Supreme Court reversed and held that:

- British subjects, if otherwise entitled, may prosecute claims against the United States in the Court of Claims.
- the claimants were allowed to make a claim and recover the proceeds because the pardon guaranteed that no offense connected with the rebellion could be imputed to the claimants.
- "[an] alien, whilst domiciled in the country, owes a local and temporary allegiance, which continues during the period of his residence."
