= Posthumous citizenship =

Citizenship granted after a persons death

Posthumous citizenship is a form of honorary citizenship granted by countries to immigrants or other foreigners after their deaths.

== Israel ==
In the late 1940s, Mordechai Shenhavi, one of the early supporters of the creation of an Israeli national memorial authority whose efforts would eventually lead to the building of Yad Vashem, made the first proposal to grant honorary posthumous Israeli citizenship to all of the victims of the Holocaust. Israeli legal experts looked into the idea, but the government eventually decided to move ahead with the building of the memorial first, leaving the idea of posthumous citizenship to be resolved later. There were voices of opposition to Shenhavi's plan, such as Jacob Blaustein of the American Jewish Committee, and as a result, the Israeli government at the time chose not to make a blanket grant of posthumous citizenship but instead granted it only upon application by a relative or friend of one of the dead.

However, in 1985, Israel granted posthumous citizenship to all the six million Jewish victims of the Holocaust. After the Knesset approved the decision, the Israeli Minister for Education, Yitzhak Navon, signed a proclamation granting posthumous citizenship to all the six million Jewish victims of the Holocaust.

== Netherlands ==
Dutch nationality law makes no provision for a posthumous grant of citizenship. In 2004, a television programme about Anne Frank sparked public interest in granting her posthumous citizenship. Frank had moved to the Netherlands with her family while a young girl, and her father became a Dutch citizen after her death. A spokeswoman for Immigration Minister Rita Verdonk stated that the ministry was trying to find a way in which this could be accomplished, but expressed her doubt that it would be possible. However, the proposal did not enjoy universal support; Patricia Bosboom of the Anne Frank House museum stated, "She was as Dutch as you can be. Giving her citizenship would add nothing", while David Barnouw of the Dutch Institute for War Documentation described it as insulting to other victims of the Holocaust. In the end, Frank was not granted citizenship under the proposal.

== United States ==
In the United States, Pub. L. 101–249 (8 U.S.C. §§ 1440–1441) allows the next-of-kin of non-U.S. citizens who died due to injuries sustained while on active duty with the United States Armed Forces to request that the Secretary of Homeland Security grant posthumous citizenship to the deceased. That is an honorary status which does not confer any immigration benefits to the decedent's relatives. In the 2000s and 2010s, there were roughly 30,000 to 40,000 service members who were not U.S. citizens; by 2007, a total of 59 non-citizens who had died on active duty had been granted posthumous citizenship. The process of gaining posthumous citizenship is not automatic and requires the submission of an application form, but family members of soldiers killed on duty have suggested making the grant of posthumous citizenship automatic instead, and a number of members of Congress have sponsored bills to that end.

There have also been calls for the granting of posthumous citizenship to other individuals or groups. In 2004 and again in 2007, Congressman Steve Israel sponsored a bill to grant posthumous citizenship to Anne Frank. Her cousin Bernhard Elias expressed misgivings about the idea, stating that Anne herself had wanted to be Dutch, and others including Emory University Institute for Jewish Studies director Deborah Lipstadt stated that the United States should not have the right to claim Frank's legacy after having rebuffed the efforts of her family and thousands of other Jewish refugees from Europe to immigrate to the United States in the early years of World War II.

In 2013, Daniel Swalm, the grandson of a Minnesota woman who had lost US citizenship under Section 3 of the Expatriation Act of 1907 for marrying a Swedish immigrant and died without regaining her citizenship, began lobbying Congress for posthumous citizenship to women like his grandmother. He contacted his senator Al Franken, who in 2014 sponsored a resolution (S.Res. 402) expressing regret for the passage of the 1907 Act.
