= List of United States Supreme Court cases, volume 28 =

Supreme Court of the United States
- Interactive map of Supreme Court of the United States
- 38°53′26″N 77°00′16″W
- Established: March 4, 1789; 237 years ago
- Location: Washington, D.C.
- Coordinates: 38°53′26″N 77°00′16″W
- Composition method: Presidential nomination with Senate confirmation
- Authorised by: Constitution of the United States, Art. III, § 1
- Judge term length: life tenure, subject to impeachment and removal
- Number of positions: 9 (by statute)
- Website: supremecourt.gov

This is a list of cases reported in volume 28 (3 Pet.) of United States Reports, decided by the Supreme Court of the United States in 1830.

== Nominative reports ==
In 1874, the U.S. government created the United States Reports, and retroactively numbered older privately published case reports as part of the new series. As a result, cases appearing in volumes 1–90 of U.S. Reports have dual citation forms; one for the volume number of U.S. Reports, and one for the volume number of the reports named for the relevant reporter of decisions (these are called "nominative reports").

=== Richard Peters, Jr. ===
Starting with the 26th volume of U.S. Reports, the Reporter of Decisions of the Supreme Court of the United States was Richard Peters Jr. Peters was Reporter of Decisions from 1828 to 1843, covering volumes 26 through 41 of United States Reports which correspond to volumes 1 through 16 of his Peters's Reports. As such, the dual form of citation to, for example, Ex parte Watkins is 28 U.S. (3 Pet.) 193 (1830).

== Justices of the Supreme Court at the time of 28 U.S. (3 Pet.) ==
The Supreme Court is established by Article III, Section 1 of the Constitution of the United States, which says: "The judicial Power of the United States, shall be vested in one supreme Court . . .". The size of the Court is not specified; the Constitution leaves it to Congress to set the number of justices. Under the Judiciary Act of 1789 Congress originally fixed the number of justices at six (one chief justice and five associate justices). Since 1789 Congress has varied the size of the Court from six to seven, nine, ten, and back to nine justices (always including one chief justice).

When the cases in 28 U.S. (3 Pet.) were decided, the Court comprised these seven justices:

Portrait	Justice	Office	Home State	Succeeded	Date confirmed by the Senate (Vote)	Tenure on Supreme Court
	John Marshall	Chief Justice	Virginia	Oliver Ellsworth	January 27, 1801 (Acclamation)	February 4, 1801 – July 6, 1835 (Died)
	William Johnson	Associate Justice	South Carolina	Alfred Moore	March 24, 1804 (Acclamation)	May 7, 1804 – August 4, 1834 (Died)
	Gabriel Duvall	Associate Justice	Maryland	Samuel Chase	November 18, 1811 (Acclamation)	November 23, 1811 – January 12, 1835 (Resigned)
	Joseph Story	Associate Justice	Massachusetts	William Cushing	November 18, 1811 (Acclamation)	February 3, 1812 – September 10, 1845 (Died)
	Smith Thompson	Associate Justice	New York	Henry Brockholst Livingston	December 9, 1823 (Acclamation)	September 1, 1823 – December 18, 1843 (Died)
	John McLean	Associate Justice	Ohio	Robert Trimble	March 7, 1829 (Acclamation)	January 11, 1830 – April 4, 1861 (Died)
	Henry Baldwin	Associate Justice	Pennsylvania	Bushrod Washington	January 6, 1830 (41–2)	January 18, 1830 – April 21, 1844 (Died)

== Citation style ==
Under the Judiciary Act of 1789 the federal court structure at the time comprised District Courts, which had general trial jurisdiction; Circuit Courts, which had mixed trial and appellate (from the US District Courts) jurisdiction; and the United States Supreme Court, which had appellate jurisdiction over the federal District and Circuit courts—and for certain issues over state courts. The Supreme Court also had limited original jurisdiction (i.e., in which cases could be filed directly with the Supreme Court without first having been heard by a lower federal or state court). There were one or more federal District Courts and/or Circuit Courts in each state, territory, or other geographical region.

Bluebook citation style is used for case names, citations, and jurisdictions.

- "C.C.D." = United States Circuit Court for the District of . . .
  - e.g.,"C.C.D.N.J." = United States Circuit Court for the District of New Jersey
- "D." = United States District Court for the District of . . .
  - e.g.,"D. Mass." = United States District Court for the District of Massachusetts
- "E." = Eastern; "M." = Middle; "N." = Northern; "S." = Southern; "W." = Western
  - e.g.,"C.C.S.D.N.Y." = United States Circuit Court for the Southern District of New York
  - e.g.,"M.D. Ala." = United States District Court for the Middle District of Alabama
- "Ct. Cl." = United States Court of Claims
- The abbreviation of a state's name alone indicates the highest appellate court in that state's judiciary at the time.
  - e.g.,"Pa." = Supreme Court of Pennsylvania
  - e.g.,"Me." = Supreme Judicial Court of Maine

== List of cases in 28 U.S. (3 Pet.) ==
Case Name	Page & year	Opinion of the Court	Concurring opinion(s)	Dissenting opinion(s)	Lower Court	Disposition
Keene v. Meade	1 (1830)	Thompson	none	none	C.C.D.C.	affirmed
United States v. Buford	12 (1830)	McLean	none	none	C.C.D. Ky.	affirmed
Gordon v. Ogden	33 (1830)	Marshall	none	none	C.C.D.E. La.	dismissed
Thornton v. Bank of Washington	36 (1830)	Story	none	none	C.C.D.C.	affirmed
Willison v. Watkins	43 (1830)	Baldwin	none	Johnson	C.C.D.S.C.	reversed
United States v. Preston	57 (1830)	Johnson	none	none	C.C.E.D. La.	reversed
Second Bank of the United States v. Swan	68 (1830)	Marshall	none	none	not indicated	dismissal denied
Bell v. Cunningham	69 (1830)	Marshall	none	none	C.C.D. Mass.	affirmed
Magruder v. Union Bank	87 (1830)	Marshall	none	none	C.C.D.C.	reversed
Chinoweth v. Haskell's Lessee	92 (1830)	Marshall	none	none	W.D. Va.	reversed
Inglis v. Sailor's Snug Harbour	99 (1830)	Thompson	Johnson	Story	C.C.S.D.N.Y.	certification
Ex parte Watkins	193 (1830)	Marshall	none	none	C.C.D.C.	habeas corpus denied
Boyce's Executors v. Grundy	210 (1830)	Johnson	none	none	C.C.D.W. Tenn.	affirmed
Patapsco Insurance Company v. Coulter	222 (1830)	Johnson	none	none	C.C.D. Md.	affirmed
Shanks v. Dupont	242 (1830)	Story	none	Johnson	S.C. Ct. App.	reversed
Wolf v. Usher	269 (1830)	per curiam	none	none	C.C.D.R.I.	certification
M'Cluny v. Silliman	270 (1830)	McLean	none	none	C.C.D. Ohio	affirmed
Jackson v. Lamphire	280 (1830)	Baldwin	none	none	N.Y.	affirmed
Harris v. Dennie	292 (1830)	Story	none	none	Mass.	reversed
Canter v. American Insurance Company	307 (1830)	Story	none	none	C.C.D.S.C.	affirmed
Stringer v. Archibald's Lessee	320 (1830)	Marshall	none	none	C.C.W.D. Va.	affirmed
Finlay v. King's Lessee	346 (1830)	Marshall	none	Johnson	W.D. Va.	affirmed
Anonymous	397 (1830)	Marshall	none	none	not indicated	judgment denied
Fowle v. City of Alexandria	398 (1830)	Marshall	none	none	C.C.D.C.	affirmed
Clay v. Smith	411 (1830)	Johnson	none	none	D. La.	reversed
Parsons v. Armor	413 (1830)	Johnson	none	none	D. La.	reversed
Bank of Kentucky v. Wistar	431 (1830)	Marshall	none	none	C.C.D. Ky.	judgment reformed
Parsons v. Breedlove	433 (1830)	Story	none	McLean	E.D. La.	affirmed
Farrar v. United States	459 (1830)	Marshall	none	none	not indicated	dismissal denied
New Jersey v. New York	461 (1830)	Marshall	none	none	original	subpoena granted
Smith v. Honey	469 (1830)	per curiam	none	none	D. Mo.	dismissed
M'Donald v. Magruder	470 (1830)	Marshall	none	none	C.C.D.C.	reversed

== See also ==
- certificate of division
