= Citizenship Reform Act of 2005 =

Amendment bill

- Long title: To amend the Immigration and Nationality Act to deny citizenship at birth to children born in the United States of parents who are not citizens or permanent resident aliens.
- Announced in: the 109th United States Congress
- Number of co-sponsors: 87

Legislative history
- Introduced in the House of Representatives as H.R. 698 by Nathan Deal (R–GA) on February 9, 2005; Committee consideration by United States House Committee on the Judiciary

The proposed Citizenship Reform Act of 2005 (H.R. 698) was a U.S. congressional bill introduced in the 109th United States Congress by Re. Nathan Deal (R-GA). The legislation aimed to deny birthright citizenship to individuals born in the United States whose parents were not citizens or permanent residents.

If enacted into law, the legislation have amended the Immigration and Nationality Act of 1965 to limit automatic citizenship at birth to apply only to a child born in the United States who were: 1) born in wedlock to parents either of whom was then a U.S. citizen or national or an alien lawfully admitted for permanent residence who maintained such residence; or (2) was born out of wedlock to a mother who was then a U.S. citizen or national or an alien lawfully admitted for permanent residence who maintained such residence. The legislation was introduced by Republican Representative Nathan Deal of Georgia.

== Background and provisions ==
In the Slaughter-House Cases, 83 U.S. 36 (1873) — a civil rights case not dealing specifically with birthright citizenship — a Supreme Court majority mentioned in passing that "the phrase 'subject to its jurisdiction' was intended to exclude from its operation children of ministers, consuls, and citizens or subjects of foreign States born within the United States"

The bill would have accomplished its objective by defining children not falling into the above categories as not being "subject to the jurisdiction" of the United States, and thus not entitled to automatic citizenship via the Fourteenth Amendment. Section 1 of the amendment reads :

"All persons born or naturalized in the United States, and subject to the jurisdiction thereof, are citizens of the United States and of the State wherein they reside. No State shall make or enforce any law which shall abridge the privileges or immunities of citizens of the United States; nor shall any State deprive any person of life, liberty, or property, without due process of law; nor deny to any person within its jurisdiction the equal protection of the laws."

== Legislative history ==
H.R. 698 was introduced in early 2005, was referred to the House Subcommittee on Immigration, Border Security, and Claims, but saw no subsequent action and died when the 109th Congress adjourned sine die on December 9, 2006. Similar bills had been introduced in at least three previous Congresses — H.R. 1567 in the 108th Congress, H.R. 190 in the 107th Congress, and H.R. 319 in the 106th Congress — but, just like H.R. 698, all of them died without having been voted upon when Congress adjourned.

== Analysis ==
Whether a bill such as the Citizenship Reform Act of 2005 would manage to accomplish its intended purpose, even if it were to be enacted into law by Congress, is unclear. In a 1982 case, Plyler v. Doe, the Supreme Court rejected the suggestion that illegal immigrants to the United States might not be "subject to the jurisdiction" of the United States within the meaning of the Fourteenth Amendment.

If a future Supreme Court were to rule similarly to the Plyler court, this would likely mean that the sort of change envisioned by the Citizenship Reform Act of 2005 could be accomplished only via an amendment to the Constitution.
