= Expatriation Act of 1907 =

Act of the 59th United States Congress

- Long title: Act relating to expatriation of citizens and their protection abroad; citizenship of women by marriage; citizenship of children born abroad of citizen fathers
- Enacted by: the 59th United States Congress
- Effective: March 2, 1907

Citations
- Statutes at Large: 34 Stat. 1228

United States Supreme Court cases
- Mackenzie v. Hare, 239 U.S. 299 (1915); Savorgnan v. United States, 338 U.S. 491 (1950)

The Expatriation Act of 1907 (59th Congress, 2nd session, chapter 2534, enacted March 2, 1907) was an act of the 59th United States Congress concerning retention and relinquishment of United States nationality by married women and Americans residing abroad. It effectively functioned as Congressional endorsement of the various ad hoc rulings on loss of United States nationality that had been made by the State Department since the enactment of the Expatriation Act of 1868. Some sections of it were repealed by other acts in the early 1920s; those sections which remained were codified at 8 U.S.C. §§ 6–17, but those too were repealed by the Nationality Act of 1940 when the question of dual citizenship arose.

== Background ==
This act was an attempt by Congress to resolve issues related to the status of citizenship, including those Americans living outside the United States, married women, and children born outside the country to American citizens. A particular concern during the last half of the nineteenth century was that of dual citizenship. During this period, several countries had established laws which gave their nationality to alien wives of male citizens, which raised the question of whether or not American women were being granted dual citizenships by marrying men from these countries.

A prominent case involving the daughter of President Ulysses S. Grant attempted to resolve this issue. In 1874, Nellie Grant married Algernon Charles Frederick Sartoris, an Englishman, in a White House ceremony. Following the wedding, the couple left the country to reside in Great Britain. British law stated that an alien woman became a British subject when she married a citizen of Great Britain, and this brought up the question of what the citizenship status for women like Nellie Grant was. It was decided that the Act of 1868 determined that, by establishing residency outside the country, she had relinquished her American citizenship. This did not address the question of those women who maintained US residency during their marriage. When Nellie Grant Sartoris returned to the United States at the end of her marriage, State Department practice at the time held that, by returning, she automatically regained her citizenship. Despite this, in 1896, she petitioned Congress to reinstate her American nationality. In a Special Act of 1898, she regained an unconditional resumption of her citizenship.

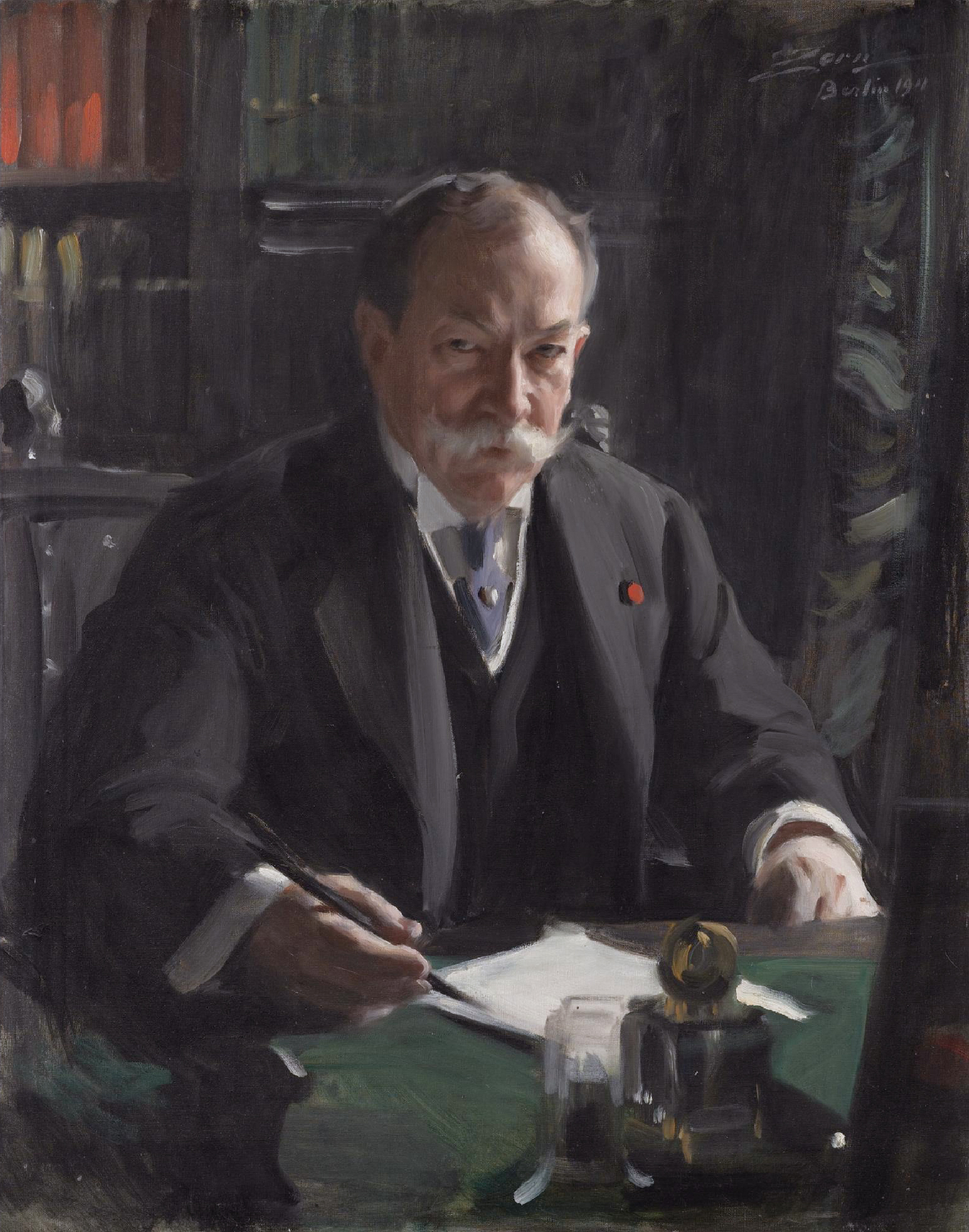
The recommendations of U.S. Minister to the Netherlands David Jayne Hill (pictured) and his State Department colleagues formed the basis for Section 2 of the Expatriation Act of 1907.

The Act of 1907 contained seven sections, the last regarding rules of evidence for matters in the act, and the other six relating to citizenship and passports.

=== Alien's passports ===
Section 1 provided for the issuance of non-renewable alien's passports of six months' validity to non-citizens who had lived in the United States for three years and had made a declaration of intention to become US citizens. This provision was repealed by the Act of June 4, 1920 (41 Stat. 751, An Act Making appropriations for the Diplomatic and Consular Service for the fiscal year ending June 30, 1921).

=== Americans residing abroad ===
Section 2 contained three grounds for loss of United States citizenship: naturalization in a foreign state, taking an oath of allegiance to a foreign state, or specifically for a naturalized citizen residing for two years in one's foreign state of origin or five years in any other foreign state; it also provided that citizenship could be lost only in peacetime. It was repealed by Section 504 of the Nationality Act of 1940; however, a saving clause in the 1940 Act provided that nothing in that Act would affect the status of those who had already lost citizenship prior to its passage.

The background of this section goes back to a 1906 recommendation by the House Committee on Foreign Affairs that the State Department form a commission of inquiry on the subject of nationality laws and their relation to US citizens living abroad. Acting Secretary of State Robert Bacon named international law expert James Brown Scott, Minister to the Netherlands David Jayne Hill, and Passports Bureau chief Gaillard Hunt to the commission. Their report was published later that year.

In addition to the provisions which actually ended up in the Act, the commission had also recommended that persons wishing to re-acquire US citizenship "be required to comply with the laws applicable to the naturalization of aliens". However, this was not adopted by Congress. Another difference between the law and the previous practice of the State Department was that any oath to a foreign state became grounds for loss of US citizenship even if no foreign nationality was acquired by that oath. Congress and the State Department were in agreement that loss of citizenship in wartime should not be permitted; this had been a long-standing principle in US law going back to Talbot v. Jansen in 1795, and Secretary of State Hamilton Fish had stated in the 1870s that permitting loss of citizenship in wartime "would be to afford a cover to desertion and treasonable aid to the public enemy."

=== Married women ===
Section 3 provided for loss of citizenship by American women who married aliens. The Act states that an American woman who marries an alien would lose her citizenship and take on her husband’s nationality. In actuality, whether or not she could do this was dependent on the laws of the country to which her husband belonged. If there was no similar law granting derivative citizenship to a married woman, she would then become stateless.

As a result of her loss of citizenship, she forfeited her constitutional rights and could be subject to deportation and denial of reentry to the United States. Her opportunities for employment would be restricted — for example ineligible for any kind of government work and, in some states, for teaching in a public school. During World War I, any woman married to a German national was required to register as an "enemy alien", and was subject to having property confiscated by the US government through the Office of Alien Property Custodian.

The act also gave conditions under which a woman could regain her American citizenship. While still married to an alien, under the terms of section 4 of this act, she could become a naturalized citizen only if her husband applied for, was accepted, and completed this naturalization. After the marriage was terminated, by annulment, divorce, or death, there were three ways for her to repatriate. If she had resided in the United States during her marriage, by remaining in this country, she would automatically regain citizenship. Those women who lived abroad during the marriage could return to the US and establish residency, for automatic repatriation. If she chose to remain outside the country, she had to register as an American citizen at an American consul, within one year of the end of the marriage.

An act of Congress in 1855 had granted automatic citizenship to alien wives of men who were American citizens, native born or naturalized. This act had not addressed the status of these women following the termination of their marriage. Section 4 of the Act of 1907 provided for the retention of citizenship in these cases. Those women who had resided in the United States would retain citizenship, if they continued to live in the country and did not renounce their American citizenship. Those women residing abroad at the end of their marriage, were required to register as an American citizen at a US consulate, within one year, in order to retain their citizenship.

Petition of naturalization for Harriot Stanton Blatch submitted in 1911 in order to regain her American citizenship.

It was not until American born wives of aliens attempted to register to vote, in those states that had granted the vote to women prior to 1919, that the implications of these two sections of the Act were fully understood. Among leading suffragists this act affected were Harriot Stanton Blatch, Inez Milholland, and Crystal Eastman. These three women, all born in the United States and fighting for the right of American women to gain the vote, had married men who were not American citizens and, as a result of the Act of 1907, had lost their American citizenship. Harriot Stanton Blatch attempted to regain her citizenship by filing a petition of naturalization in 1911. However, her husband was still living and had not applied for citizenship himself, so she was ineligible for reinstatement. Following his death, in 1915, she was repatriated following the terms of this act.

In 1917, Jeannette Rankin, Montana representative, introduced a bill to amend Section 3 of the 1907 Act. However, with the outbreak of World War I, the focus on American wives of alien husbands turned toward questions concerning their patriotic loyalty and the bill was not passed.

Following the passage and ratification of the Nineteenth amendment, significant protests by members of the women's suffrage movement began, focused on the reversal of both the acts of 1855 and 1907, which established derivative citizenship for married women. They campaigned for independent naturalization which would require alien women to be qualified to naturalize and take an oath of allegiance to the United States. Two years after women gained the franchise, they were repealed by the Cable Act of 1922. However, the Cable Act itself continued to provide for the loss of citizenship by American women who married "aliens ineligible to citizenship", namely Asians. Besides excluding those women married to Asians, this exception also applied to men who had deserted the US military, those who had left the country to avoid the draft, and any who had withdrawn their Declaration of Intent to Naturalize, in order to avoid the military service. The Cable Act was amended in 1930, 1931, and 1934.

In 2013, Daniel Swalm, the grandson of a Minnesota woman who had lost US citizenship under Section 3 of the Expatriation Act of 1907 for marrying a Swedish immigrant and died without regaining her citizenship, began lobbying Congress to posthumously restore citizenship to women like his grandmother. He contacted his senator Al Franken, who in 2014 sponsored a resolution (S.Res. 402) expressing regret for the passage of the 1907 Act. The resolution passed the Senate on May 14, 2014.

=== Children born abroad ===
Section 5 provided that child born abroad to alien parents could acquire US citizenship upon the naturalization of their parents during their minority, once the minor child him or herself began to reside permanently in the US. Section 6 provided that children born abroad to US citizen parents would be required to swear an oath of allegiance before a US consul upon reaching the age of majority if they wished to retain US citizenship. Both sections were repealed by Section 504 of the Nationality Act of 1940.

== Case law ==
The Supreme Court first considered the Expatriation Act of 1907 in the 1915 case Mackenzie v. Hare. The plaintiff, a suffragist named Ethel MacKenzie, was living in California, which since 1911 had extended the franchise to women. However, she had been denied voter registration by the respondent in his capacity as a Commissioner of the San Francisco Board of Election on the grounds of her marriage to a Scottish man. MacKenzie contended that the Expatriation Act of 1907 "if intended to apply to her, is beyond the authority of Congress", as neither the Fourteenth Amendment nor any other part of the Constitution gave Congress the power to "denationalize a citizen without his concurrence". However, Justice Joseph McKenna, writing the majority opinion, stated that while "[i]t may be conceded that a change of citizenship cannot be arbitrarily imposed, that is, imposed without the concurrence of the citizen", but "[t]he law in controversy does not have that feature. It deals with a condition voluntarily entered into, with notice of the consequences". Justice James Clark McReynolds, in a concurring opinion, stated that the case should be dismissed for lack of jurisdiction.

In 1950, the Supreme Court ruled on Savorgnan v. United States. The Expatriation Act of 1907 had been repealed for nearly a decade by that point, but the case concerned a woman who married an Italian man on December 26, 1940 (after the passage of the Nationality Act of 1940, but before its effective date) and then applied for naturalization as an Italian citizen, all while still living in the United States. She later lived in Italy from 1941 to 1945, after the 1940 Act had taken effect. Justice Harold Hitz Burton, writing the majority opinion, reversed the District Court and found that the petitioner had indeed lost US citizenship. His ruling, though it relied primarily on the Nationality Act of 1940, also made reference to the Expatriation Act of 1907. He rejected the petitioner's contention that Section 2 of the Act only resulted in loss of US citizenship when the act of naturalization occurred on foreign soil, and held that it was irrelevant under the Act whether or not the petitioner had intended to renounce her US citizenship by applying for the Italian one. However, he declined to rule on the government's contention that the petitioner would have lost US citizenship even if she had not taken up residence abroad, writing that "it is not necessary to determine here whether the petitioner's residence and naturalization are to be tested under the saving clause or under the rest of the Act of 1940".
