= List of United States Supreme Court cases, volume 83 =

Supreme Court of the United States
- Interactive map of Supreme Court of the United States
- 38°53′26″N 77°00′16″W
- Established: March 4, 1789; 236 years ago
- Location: Washington, D.C.
- Coordinates: 38°53′26″N 77°00′16″W
- Composition method: Presidential nomination with Senate confirmation
- Authorised by: Constitution of the United States, Art. III, § 1
- Judge term length: life tenure, subject to impeachment and removal
- Number of positions: 9 (by statute)
- Website: supremecourt.gov

This is a list of cases reported in volume 83 (16 Wall.) of United States Reports, decided by the Supreme Court of the United States in 1873, along with two cases from 1872.

== Nominative reports ==
In 1874, the U.S. government created the United States Reports, and retroactively numbered older privately published case reports as part of the new series. As a result, cases appearing in volumes 1–90 of U.S. Reports have dual citation forms; one for the volume number of U.S. Reports, and one for the volume number of the reports named for the relevant reporter of decisions (these are called "nominative reports").

=== John William Wallace ===
Starting with the 66th volume of U.S. Reports, the Reporter of Decisions of the Supreme Court of the United States was John William Wallace. Wallace was Reporter of Decisions from 1863 to 1874, covering volumes 68 through 90 of United States Reports which correspond to volumes 1 through 23 of his Wallace's Reports. As such, the dual form of citation to, for example, Beall v. New Mexico is 83 U.S. (16 Wall.) 535 (1873).

Wallace's Reports were the final nominative reports for the US Supreme Court; starting with volume 91, cases were identified simply as "(volume #) U.S. (page #) (year)".

== Justices of the Supreme Court at the time of 83 U.S. (16 Wall.) ==
The Supreme Court is established by Article III, Section 1 of the Constitution of the United States, which says: "The judicial Power of the United States, shall be vested in one supreme Court . . .". The size of the Court is not specified; the Constitution leaves it to Congress to set the number of justices. Under the Judiciary Act of 1789 Congress originally fixed the number of justices at six (one chief justice and five associate justices). Since 1789 Congress has varied the size of the Court from six to seven, nine, ten, and back to nine justices (always including one chief justice).

When the 1873 cases in 83 U.S. (16 Wall.) were decided the Court comprised the following nine members:

Portrait	Justice	Office	Home State	Succeeded	Date confirmed by the Senate (Vote)	Tenure on Supreme Court
	Salmon P. Chase	Chief Justice	Ohio	Roger B. Taney	December 6, 1864 (Acclamation)	December 15, 1864 – May 7, 1873 (Died)
	Nathan Clifford	Associate Justice	Maine	Benjamin Robbins Curtis	January 12, 1858 (26–23)	January 21, 1858 – July 25, 1881 (Died)
	Noah Haynes Swayne	Associate Justice	Ohio	John McLean	January 24, 1862 (38–1)	January 27, 1862 – January 24, 1881 (Retired)
	Samuel Freeman Miller	Associate Justice	Iowa	Peter Vivian Daniel	July 16, 1862 (Acclamation)	July 21, 1862 – October 13, 1890 (Died)
	David Davis	Associate Justice	Illinois	John Archibald Campbell	December 8, 1862 (Acclamation)	December 10, 1862 – March 4, 1877 (Resigned)
	Stephen Johnson Field	Associate Justice	California	newly created seat	March 10, 1863 (Acclamation)	May 10, 1863 – December 1, 1897 (Retired)
	William Strong	Associate Justice	Pennsylvania	Robert Cooper Grier	February 18, 1870 (No vote recorded)	March 14, 1870 – December 14, 1880 (Retired)
	Joseph P. Bradley	Associate Justice	New Jersey	newly created seat	March 21, 1870 (46–9)	March 23, 1870 – January 22, 1892 (Died)
	Ward Hunt	Associate Justice	New York	Samuel Nelson	December 11, 1872 (Acclamation)	January 9, 1873 – January 27, 1882 (Retired)

== Notable Case in 83 U.S. (16 Wall.) ==
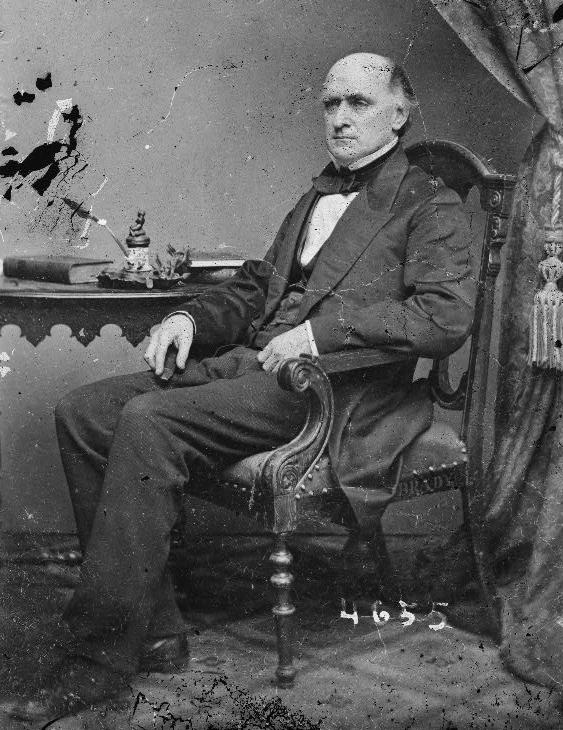
Former Justice John Archibald Campbell represented the butchers, unsuccessfully urging an expansive interpretation of the 14th Amendment.

=== Slaughter-House Cases ===
In the Slaughter-House Cases, 83 U.S. (16 Wall.) 36 (1873), the Supreme Court held that the Privileges or Immunities Clause of the Fourteenth Amendment to the U.S. Constitution only protects the legal rights that are associated with federal U.S. citizenship, not those that pertain to state citizenship. The Slaughter-House Cases essentially gutted the Privileges or Immunities Clause. In 1953, the American scholar Edward Samuel Corwin remarked: "Unique among constitutional provisions, the privileges and immunities clause of the Fourteenth Amendment enjoys the distinction of having been rendered a practical nullity by a single decision of the Supreme Court rendered within five years after its ratification".

== Citation style ==
Under the Judiciary Act of 1789 the federal court structure at the time comprised District Courts, which had general trial jurisdiction; Circuit Courts, which had mixed trial and appellate (from the US District Courts) jurisdiction; and the United States Supreme Court, which had appellate jurisdiction over the federal District and Circuit courts—and for certain issues over state courts. The Supreme Court also had limited original jurisdiction (i.e., in which cases could be filed directly with the Supreme Court without first having been heard by a lower federal or state court). There were one or more federal District Courts and/or Circuit Courts in each state, territory, or other geographical region.

Bluebook citation style is used for case names, citations, and jurisdictions.

- "C.C.D." = United States Circuit Court for the District of . . .
  - e.g.,"C.C.D.N.J." = United States Circuit Court for the District of New Jersey
- "D." = United States District Court for the District of . . .
  - e.g.,"D. Mass." = United States District Court for the District of Massachusetts
- "E." = Eastern; "M." = Middle; "N." = Northern; "S." = Southern; "W." = Western
  - e.g.,"C.C.S.D.N.Y." = United States Circuit Court for the Southern District of New York
  - e.g.,"M.D. Ala." = United States District Court for the Middle District of Alabama
- "Ct. Cl." = United States Court of Claims
- The abbreviation of a state's name alone indicates the highest appellate court in that state's judiciary at the time.
  - e.g.,"Pa." = Supreme Court of Pennsylvania
  - e.g.,"Me." = Supreme Judicial Court of Maine

== List of cases in 83 U.S. (16 Wall.) ==
Case Name	Page and year	Opinion of the Court	Concurring opinion(s)	Dissenting opinion(s)	Lower Court	Disposition
Dair v. United States	1 (1873)	Davis	none	none	C.C.D. Ind.	affirmed
Lynde v. Winnebago County	6 (1873)	Swayne	none	Field	C.C.D. Iowa	reversed
Voorhees v. Bonesteel	16 (1873)	Clifford	none	none	C.C.S.D.N.Y.	affirmed
The Commerce	33 (1873)	Strong	none	none	C.C.D. Md.	affirmed
Slaughter-House Cases	36 (1873)	Miller	none	Field; Bradley; Swayne	La.	affirmed
Bradwell v. State	130 (1873)	Miller	Bradley	none	Ill.	affirmed
Mahan v. United States	143 (1873)	Miller	none	none	Ct. Cl.	affirmed
Carlisle v. United States	147 (1873)	Field	none	none	Ct. Cl.	reversed
Collector v. Doswell and Company	156 (1873)	Miller	none	none	C.C.D. La.	affirmed
James v. City of Milwaukee	159 (1872)	Swayne	none	none	C.C.E.D. Wis.	reversed
Garnharts v. United States	162 (1873)	Clifford	none	none	M.D. Ala.	reversed
Hanrick v. Barton	166 (1873)	Bradley	none	none	C.C.W.D. Tex.	reversed
The Cayuga	177 (1873)	Clifford	none	none	C.C.S.D.N.Y.	affirmed
Smith v. Adsit	185 (1873)	Strong	none	none	Ill.	dismissed
First National Bank v. Turnbull and Company	190 (1873)	Swayne	none	none	C.C.D. Va.	reversed
Koontz v. Northern Bank	196 (1873)	Field	none	none	C.C.S.D. Miss.	affirmed
Davis v. Gray	203 (1873)	Swayne	none	Davis	C.C.W.D. Tex.	affirmed
Pierce v. Carskadon	234 (1873)	Field	none	Bradley	W. Va.	reversed
Peabody v. Stark	240 (1873)	Miller	none	none	C.C.M.D. Tenn.	affirmed
Humphrey v. Pegues	244 (1873)	Hunt	none	none	C.C.D.S.C.	affirmed
Dickinson v. Planters' Bank	250 (1873)	Strong	none	none	C.C.D. Tenn.	affirmed
Knickerbocker Insurance Company v. Comstock	258 (1873)	Clifford	none	none	C.C.N.D. Ill.	dismissed
Carpenter v. Longan	271 (1873)	Swayne	none	none	Sup. Ct. Terr. Colo.	reversed
Buchanan v. Smith	277 (1873)	Clifford	none	Bradley	C.C.N.D.N.Y.	affirmed
Slawson v. United States	310 (1873)	Davis	none	none	Ct. Cl.	affirmed
Walker v. Whitehead	314 (1873)	Swayne	none	none	Ga.	reversed
Michigan Central Railroad Company v. Manufacturing Company	318 (1873)	Davis	none	none	C.C.D. Conn.	affirmed
Cofield v. McClelland	331 (1873)	Hunt	none	none	Sup. Ct. Terr. Colo.	affirmed
Ripley v. Insurance Company	336 (1873)	Chase	none	none	C.C.W.D. Mich.	affirmed
Merrill v. Petty	338 (1873)	Clifford	none	none	C.C.S.D.N.Y.	dismissed
The Mary Eveline	348 (1873)	Hunt	none	none	C.C.S.D.N.Y.	reversed
Marqueze v. Bloom	351 (1873)	Chase	none	none	La.	dismissed
McNitt v. Turner	352 (1873)	Swayne	none	none	C.C.S.D. Ill.	affirmed
Taylor v. Taintor	366 (1873)	Swayne	none	Field	Conn.	affirmed
New Orleans Insurance Company v. Piaggio	378 (1873)	Clifford	none	none	C.C.D. La.	reversed
Burke v. Smith	390 (1873)	Strong	none	none	C.C.D. Ind.	affirmed
Huntington v. Texas	402 (1873)	Chase	none	none	Sup. Ct. D.C.	reversed
United States v. Huckabee	414 (1873)	Clifford	none	none	C.C.M.D. Ala.	reversed
Walker v. Henshaw	436 (1873)	Davis	none	none	Kan.	affirmed
Ribon v. Railroad Companies	446 (1873)	Swayne	none	none	C.C.D. Iowa	affirmed
Kenicott v. Wayne County	452 (1873)	Hunt	none	none	C.C.S.D. Ill.	reversed
Morgan v. Parham	471 (1873)	Hunt	none	none	C.C.S.D. Ala.	reversed
Osborne v. City of Mobile	479 (1873)	Chase	none	none	Ala.	affirmed
Planters' Bank v. Union Bank	483 (1873)	Strong	none	Bradley	C.C.D. La.	affirmed
Tweed's Case	504 (1873)	Clifford	none	Bradley	C.C.D. La.	affirmed
American Steamboat Company v. Chase	522 (1873)	Clifford	none	none	R.I.	affirmed
Beall v. New Mexico	535 (1873)	Bradley	none	none	Sup. Ct. Terr. N.M.	reversed
Mitchell v. Hawley	544 (1873)	Clifford	none	none	C.C.D. Mass.	affirmed
Marshall v. Knox	551 (1873)	Bradley	none	none	C.C.D. La.	reversed
Smith v. McCool	560 (1873)	Swayne	none	none	C.C.N.D. Ill.	affirmed
Specht v. Howard	564 (1873)	Swayne	none	none	C.C.W.D. Tenn.	affirmed
St. Paul Water Company v. Ware	566 (1873)	Clifford	none	none	C.C.D. Minn.	affirmed
Walbrun v. Babbitt	577 (1873)	Davis	none	none	C.C.D. Mo.	affirmed
Wager v. Hall	584 (1873)	Clifford	none	none	C.C.W.D. Wis.	affirmed
Kansas Pacific Railway Company v. Prescott	603 (1873)	Miller	none	none	Kan.	reversed
Crapo v. Kelly	610 (1873)	Hunt	Clifford	Bradley	N.Y. Sup. Ct.	reversed
St Joseph Township v. Rogers	644 (1873)	Clifford	none	none	C.C.S.D. Ill.	affirmed
Railroad Company v. Otoe County	667 (1873)	Strong	none	none	C.C.D. Neb.	certification
Olcott v. Fond du Lac County	678 (1873)	Strong	none	none	C.C.E.D. Wis.	reversed
Ex parte United States	699 (1872)	per curiam	none	none	Ct. Cl.	mandamus granted
