= Cable Act =

1922 United States federal law

- Other short titles: Married Women's Citizenship Act; Married Women's Independent Nationality Act; Women's Citizenship Act
- Long title: An Act relative to the naturalization and citizenship of married women.
- Nicknames: Cable Act of 1922
- Enacted by: the 67th United States Congress
- Effective: September 22, 1922 (at very bottom of page and on following pages)

Citations
- Public law: 67-346
- Statutes at Large: 42 Stat. 1021b

Codification
- Acts repealed: Expatriation Act of 1907
- Titles amended: 8 U.S.C.: Aliens and Nationality
- U.S.C. sections created: 8 U.S.C. ch. 9 §§ 367–370

Legislative history
- Introduced in the House as H.R. 12022 by John L. Cable (R–OH) on June 16, 1922; Committee consideration by House Immigration and Naturalization, Senate Immigration; Passed the House on June 20, 1922 (254-3); Passed the Senate on September 9, 1922 (Passed); Signed into law by President Warren G. Harding on September 22, 1922

The Cable Act of 1922 (ch. 411, 42 Stat. 1021, "Married Women's Independent Nationality Act") was a United States federal law that partially reversed the Expatriation Act of 1907. It is also known as the Married Women's Citizenship Act or the Women's Citizenship Act. In theory the law was designed to grant women their own national identity; however, in practice, as it still retained vestiges of coverture, tying a woman's legal identity to her husband's, it had to be amended multiple times before it granted women citizenship in their own right.

== Background ==
As early as 1804, US Naturalization Acts specifically tied married women's access to citizenship to their state of marriage. Provisions of the Naturalization Act of 1855 extended coverture by tying wives' citizenship and those of her children to the citizenship of their white husband or father. Upon passage of the Expatriation Act of 1907, marriage completely determined a woman's nationality. The law held that all wives acquired their husband's nationality upon any marriage occurring after March 2, 1907. Thus, the immigrant wife of an American man immediately became a US citizen upon marriage, but an American woman who married a foreigner lost her citizenship if her husband was not naturalized. The law was retroactive and loss of citizenship occurred without notice, leaving many women unaware that they had lost their US citizenship.

Regardless of where a wife was born or lived, she no longer had an individual nationality, rather her citizenship was legally the same as that of her spouse. To confirm her nationality, a wife was required to provide a copy of her marriage record and her husband's proof of citizenship. Leaders of the Women's Suffrage Movement opposed the idea that a woman should not have an individual identity. They also pointed to the inequality of allowing naturalized immigrant men and their wives to vote, while simultaneously denying native-born women who had married immigrants the right to exercise their franchise. As soon as the Nineteenth Amendment to the United States Constitution granted women political rights, feminists began pushing for full citizenship of women. Both political parties introduced platform policies to address the issue of women's citizenship during the 1920 presidential campaign, and in 1922, U.S. Representative John L. Cable (Ohio, R) introduced legislation to address the nationality of wives.

== Context of the Law ==
While the Cable Act specifically stated "[t]hat the right of any woman to become a naturalized citizen of the United States shall not be denied or abridged because of her sex or because she is a married woman", a wife's nationality was still dependent upon her husband's status. Until 1929, married women were required to provide the name of their spouse. She also had restrictions on residency, as if a wife lived in her husband's country for two years, or in any foreign nation for five years, her citizenship was forfeited. (Note: In U.S. v. Martin, a judge ruled that even if she did not live abroad, a woman whose husband resided abroad could have her citizenship revoked as her ability to truthfully declare her intent to permanently live in the United States would be suspect.) To retain citizenship, a wife's husband had to be a citizen, or be eligible to become a citizen. If a man was ineligible for US citizenship, his wife was also ineligible. There were various reason a husband could be ineligible to become a citizen, such as he could be racially excluded, was an anarchist, or was a practitioner of polygamy. During the early 1920s, numerous laws and court cases dealt with establishing the eligibility of people to become citizens who were non-white. (Note: The Naturalization Act of 1790 defined that white men were eligible and the Naturalization Act of 1870 passed at the end of the Civil War expanded eligibility to include blacks or men of African descent.) Europeans typically were eligible for US Citizenship. After the ruling of United States v. Bhagat Singh Thind in 1923, nearly all Asians were excluded as ineligible for citizenship. Though legally accepted that Mexicans had been granted the right to become citizens by virtue of the Treaty of Guadalupe Hidalgo (1848), naturalization officials considered their mixed indigenous ancestry and based denials of citizenship on whether or not they appeared to be European or indigenous.

The Act also did not do away with the discrepancy in men's and women's citizenship. Under its terms, an American male citizen's foreign-born wife could take advantage of a streamlined one-year process to apply for her naturalization. No such process was offered to the husbands of American women who were foreigners. Further, if she had lost her citizenship prior to enactment of the Cable Law, the statute allowed that a wife could regain her citizenship. However, if her spouse was ineligible or excluded from naturalization or she was of an excluded race, she could not repatriate. If her race allowed her citizenship, she could repatriate if the marriage was terminated through either divorce or death of the husband. If her spouse was a citizen or able to naturalize, a wife could repatriate if she lived in or re-entered the United States, and applied as a foreigner. Because of the restricted number of immigrants from each country specified in the Emergency Quota Act of 1921, a woman might not be allowed to return. The same requirement did not apply to foreign wives of American men. Wives and children of male citizens were exempt from restrictive quotas. Assuming she could return, if a wife's spouse had naturalized, she could file a petition for naturalization. However, if her spouse was not a citizen of the United States, a wife had to complete the entire naturalization process, including filing a declaration of intention, passing an examination for naturalization and taking a loyalty oath. This was seen as punitive, as people who voluntarily renounced their citizenship merely had to take the oath of allegiance to restore their nationality and because women were not reinstated as natural-born citizens.

== Amendments to 1922 Act ==
U.S. Congressional amendments to the Married Women's Citizenship Act.

Date of Enactment	Public Law Number	U.S. Statute Citation	U.S. Legislative Bill	U.S. Presidential Administration
July 3, 1930	P.L. 71-508	46 Stat. 854	H.R. 10960	Herbert Hoover
March 3, 1931	P.L. 71-829	46 Stat. 1511	H.R. 10672	Herbert Hoover
July 2, 1932	P.L. 72-248	47 Stat. 571	H.R. 10829	Herbert Hoover
May 24, 1934	P.L. 73-250	48 Stat. 797	H.R. 3673	Franklin D. Roosevelt

Inequality issues yet to be resolved focused upon ineligibility of a spouse to naturalize, whether residency should determine loss of citizenship, whether any foreign spouse should be exempt from quota restrictions, under what terms could American women repatriate, and whether mothers could transmit their nationality to their offspring. To address these issues Congress amended the Cable Act multiple times between 1930 and 1934.

1930 Cable Act Amendments removed the loss of an American woman's citizenship if she lived abroad with an alien spouse, bringing parity to the treatment of men and women, as men did not lose their citizenship if they lived abroad with a foreign wife. However, it did not provide procedures for a woman living abroad who had lost her citizenship prior to 1922 to repatriate. It also removed the requirement for a wife seeking to repatriate to meet quota restrictions for the country of her husband, allowed her to repatriate without proof of residence from within the United States, and restored her citizenship immediately upon her filing a petition to repatriate and taking the oath of allegiance.

The 1931 amendment to the Cable Act allowed women to retain their American citizenship even if they married a person ineligible for naturalization. It also allowed women living abroad to regain their nationality by providing evidence to a diplomatic or consular official that she had not ceased being an American citizen and registering with them as an American abroad.

Birthright citizenship was granted to Hawaiian women born prior to June 14, 1900 in 1932. The amendment to the Cable Act in that year reflected that Hawaiian women were no longer racially excluded from naturalizing if married to a foreign husband; however, it required women to be living in the United States to retain their citizenship. If they were not residing in the US in 1932, Hawaiian women could not be repatriated as American citizens.

Amendments to the Cable Act in 1934 were incorporated into the Equal Nationality Act of 1934. The Nationality Act allowed a married woman who had children born abroad to transmit her citizenship to her children, as male citizens were able to do. It did not contain any provisions for derivative nationality if the mother was not married to the child's father. Changes to the Cable Act specified that an alien married to an American citizen could apply for naturalization by filing a declaration of intention after residing in the United States or its territories for a minimum of three years before filing the petition. Because there was no reference to gender, the amended Cable Act extended the special naturalization rules of spousal citizenship to husbands of American wives. Before 1934 the special provisions had only been available to foreign wives of American citizens. A special section of the Act allowed Puerto Rican women who had been denationalized because of marriage prior to 2 March 1917, the date upon which Puerto Ricans were extended US nationality, the option of repatriation.

== Aftermath ==
The Cable Act was not rescinded by the 74th United States Congress' 1936 Act "to repatriate native-born women who have heretofore lost their citizenship by marriage to an alien, and for other purposes". This law reiterated that a woman who had lost her citizenship because of marriage to an alien before September 22, 1922, could regain her citizenship if the marriage had terminated, as long as she took the oath of citizenship. However, the fifth and final chapter of the Nationality Act of 1940 in effect repealed the first 4 sections, and amendments of the Cable Act, allowing all women whose citizenship had been lost by marriage to repatriate without regard to their marital status.
