= Executive Order 13769 =

2017 United States executive order

- Protecting the Nation from Foreign Terrorist Entry into the United States

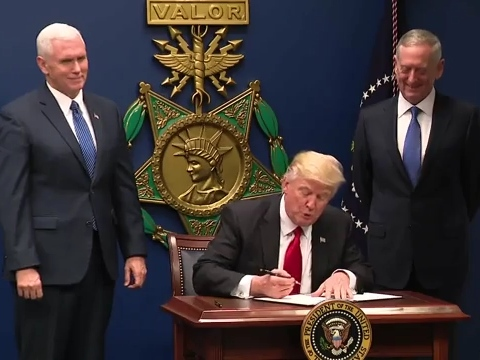
- U.S. president Donald Trump signing the order at the Pentagon, with Vice President Mike Pence (left) and Secretary of Defense Jim Mattis
- Executive Order 13769 in the Federal Register
- Type: Executive order
- Number: 13769
- President: Donald Trump
- Signed: January 27, 2017

Federal Register details
- Federal Register document number: 2017-02281
- Publication date: January 27, 2017
- Document citation: 82 FR 8977

Summary
- Suspends the U.S. Refugee Admissions Program for 120 days*; Restricts admission of citizens from seven countries for 90 days*; Orders list of countries for entry restrictions after 90 days; Suspends admission of Syrian refugees indefinitely; Prioritizes refugee claims by individuals from minority religions on the basis of religious-based persecution; Expedites a biometric tracking system; Other provisions; * Not in force since 3 February 2017

Repealed by
- Executive Order 13780, "Protecting The Nation From Foreign Terrorist Entry Into The United States", March 16, 2017

Executive Order 13769, titled "Protecting the Nation from Foreign Terrorist Entry into the United States", (Note: Also known as the "Muslim ban" by President Donald Trump and others, or the Muslim travel ban, Trump travel ban, the Trump Muslim travel ban, or the Trump Muslim Immigration Ban.) was an executive order signed by U.S. president Donald J. Trump. Except for the extent to which it was blocked by various courts, it was in effect from January 27, 2017, until March 6, 2017, when it was superseded by Executive Order 13780, a second order sharing the same title.

Part of a series of executive actions, Executive Order 13769 lowered the number of refugees to be admitted into the United States in 2017 to 50,000, suspended the U.S. Refugee Admissions Program (USRAP) for 120 days, suspended the entry of Syrian refugees indefinitely, directed some cabinet secretaries to suspend entry of those whose countries do not meet adjudication standards under U.S. immigration law for 90 days, and included exceptions on a case-by-case basis. The Department of Homeland Security (DHS) listed these countries as Iran, Libya, Somalia, Sudan, Syria, and Yemen. Iraq was also included until it was dropped following sharp criticism from the Iraqi government and promises of improved vetting of Iraqi citizens in collaboration with the Iraqi government. More than 700 travelers were detained, and up to 60,000 visas were "provisionally revoked".

The signing of the executive order provoked widespread condemnation and protests and resulted in legal intervention against the enforcement of the order. Critics referred to it as a "Muslim ban", because President Trump had previously called for a temporary ban on Muslims entering the United States, and because all of the affected countries had a Muslim majority, although the affected Muslims were only 12% of the global Muslim population. Critics proposed that this was due to Trump having business ties with Muslim majority countries which were excluded. A nationwide temporary restraining order (TRO) was issued on February 3, 2017, in the case Washington v. Trump, which was upheld by the United States Court of Appeals for the Ninth Circuit on February 9, 2017. Consequently, the Department of Homeland Security stopped enforcing portions of the order and the State Department re-validated visas that had been previously revoked. Later, other orders (Executive Order 13780 and Presidential Proclamation 9645) were signed by President Trump and superseded Executive Order 13769. On June 26, 2018, the U.S. Supreme Court upheld the third Executive Order (Presidential Proclamation 9645) and its accompanying travel ban in a 5–4 decision, with the majority opinion being written by Chief Justice John Roberts.

On January 20, 2021, President Joe Biden, shortly after he was inaugurated, revoked Executive Order 13780 and related proclamations with Presidential Proclamation 10141. On January 20, 2025, the first day of his second term, Trump signed Executive Order 14161, titled "Protecting the United States from Foreign Terrorists and Other National Security and Public Safety Threats". This new order was described by critics as a revival of Executive Order 13780's travel ban, though it was viewed as being far more expansive in comparison.

== Background ==
=== Statutory authorization and related prohibitions ===
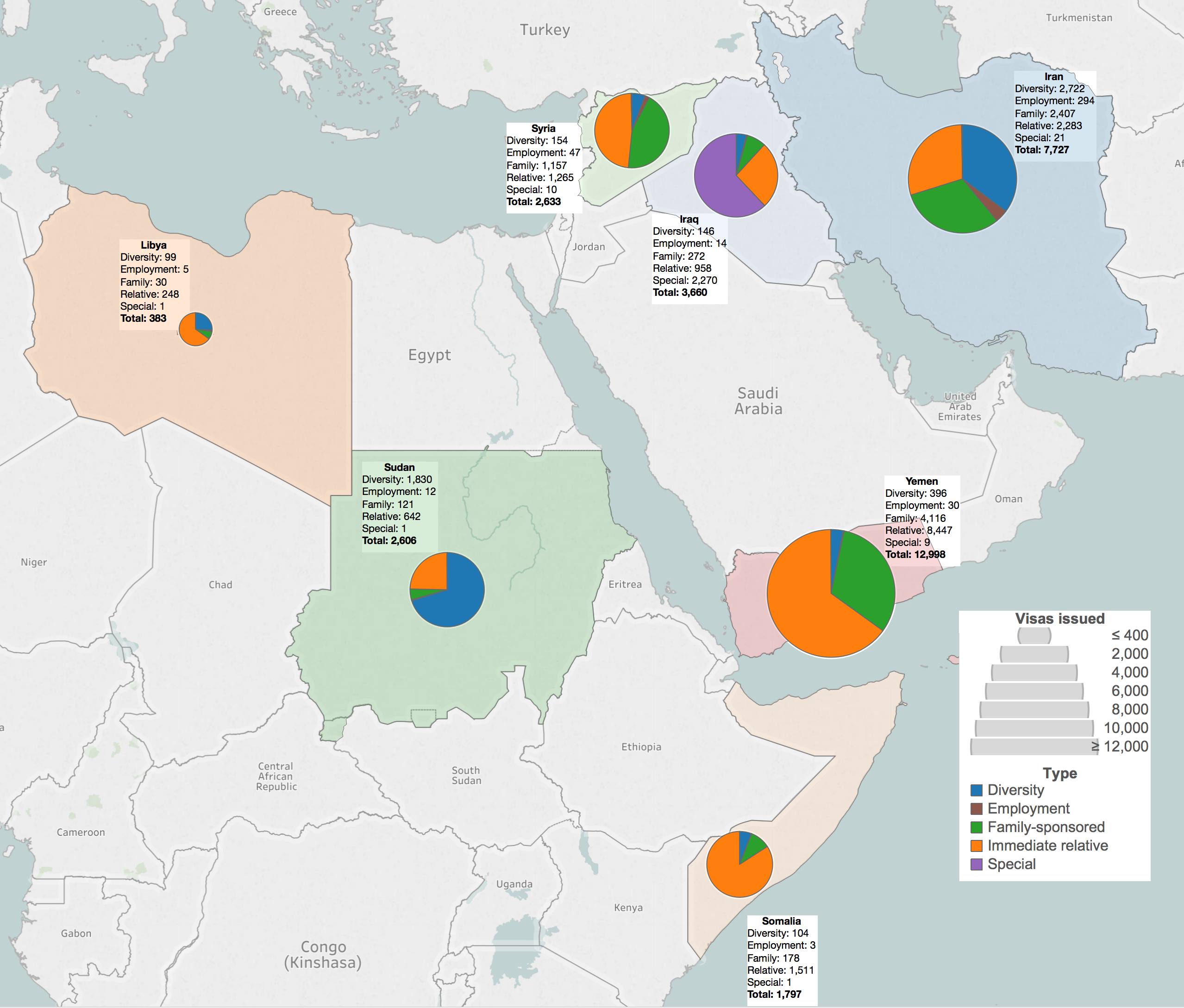
Visas issued in 2016 for the 7 countries affected by section 3 of the executive order. Total is shown by size, and color breaks down type of visa.

Key provisions of executive orders 13769 and 13780 cite to paragraph (f) of Title 8 of the United States Code § 1182, which discusses inadmissible aliens. Paragraph (f) states:

Whenever the President finds that the entry of any aliens or of any class of aliens into the United States would be detrimental to the interests of the United States, he may by proclamation, and for such period as he shall deem necessary, suspend the entry of all aliens or any class of aliens as immigrants or nonimmigrants, or impose on the entry of aliens any restrictions he may deem to be appropriate. (Note: 8 U.S.C. § 1182(f))

The act that underlies this, known as the Immigration and Nationality Act of 1952 (a.k.a. the McCarran–Walter Act), was amended by the Immigration and Nationality Act of 1965 (a.k.a. the Hart−Celler Act), which included a provision stating

No person shall receive any preference or priority or be discriminated against in the issuance of an immigrant visa because of the person's race, sex, nationality, place of birth, or place of residence. (Note: 8 U.S.C. § 1152(a))

The language in the INA of 1965 is among the reasons District of Maryland Judge Chuang issued a temporary restraining order blocking Section 2(c) of Executive Order 13780.

=== Restrictions by the Obama administration ===
In 1986, the Visa Waiver Program was initiated by President Ronald Reagan, allowing alien nationals of select countries to travel to the United States for up to 90 days without a visa, in return for reciprocal treatment of U.S. nationals. By 2016, the program had been extended to 38 countries. In 2015, Congress passed a Consolidated Appropriations Act to fund the government, and Obama signed the bill into law. The Visa Waiver Program Improvement and Terrorist Travel Prevention Act of 2015, which was previously passed by the House of Representatives as H.R. 158, was incorporated into the Consolidated Appropriations Act as Division O, Title II, Section 203. The Trump administration's executive order relied on H.R. 158, as enacted. The Visa Waiver Program Improvement and Terrorist Travel Prevention Act originally affected four countries: Iraq, Syria, and countries on the State Sponsors of Terrorism list (Iran and Sudan). Foreigners who were nationals of those countries, or who had visited those countries since 2011, were required to obtain a visa to enter the United States, even if they were nationals or dual-nationals of the 38 countries participating in the Visa Waiver Program. Libya, Yemen, and Somalia were added later as "countries of concern" by Secretary of Homeland Security Jeh Johnson during the Obama administration. The executive order refers to these countries as "countries designated pursuant to Division O, Title II, Section 203 of the 2016 consolidated Appropriations Act". Prior to this, in 2011, additional background checks were imposed on the nationals of Iraq.

Trump's press secretary Sean Spicer cited these existing restrictions as evidence that the executive order was based on outstanding policies saying that the seven targeted countries were "put (...) first and foremost" by the Obama administration. Fact-checkers at PolitiFact.com, The New York Times, and The Washington Post said the Obama restrictions cannot be compared to this executive order because they were in response to a credible threat and were not a blanket ban on all individuals from those countries, and concluded that the Trump administration's statements about the Obama administration were misleading and false.

=== Trump campaign and administration statements before the order's signing ===
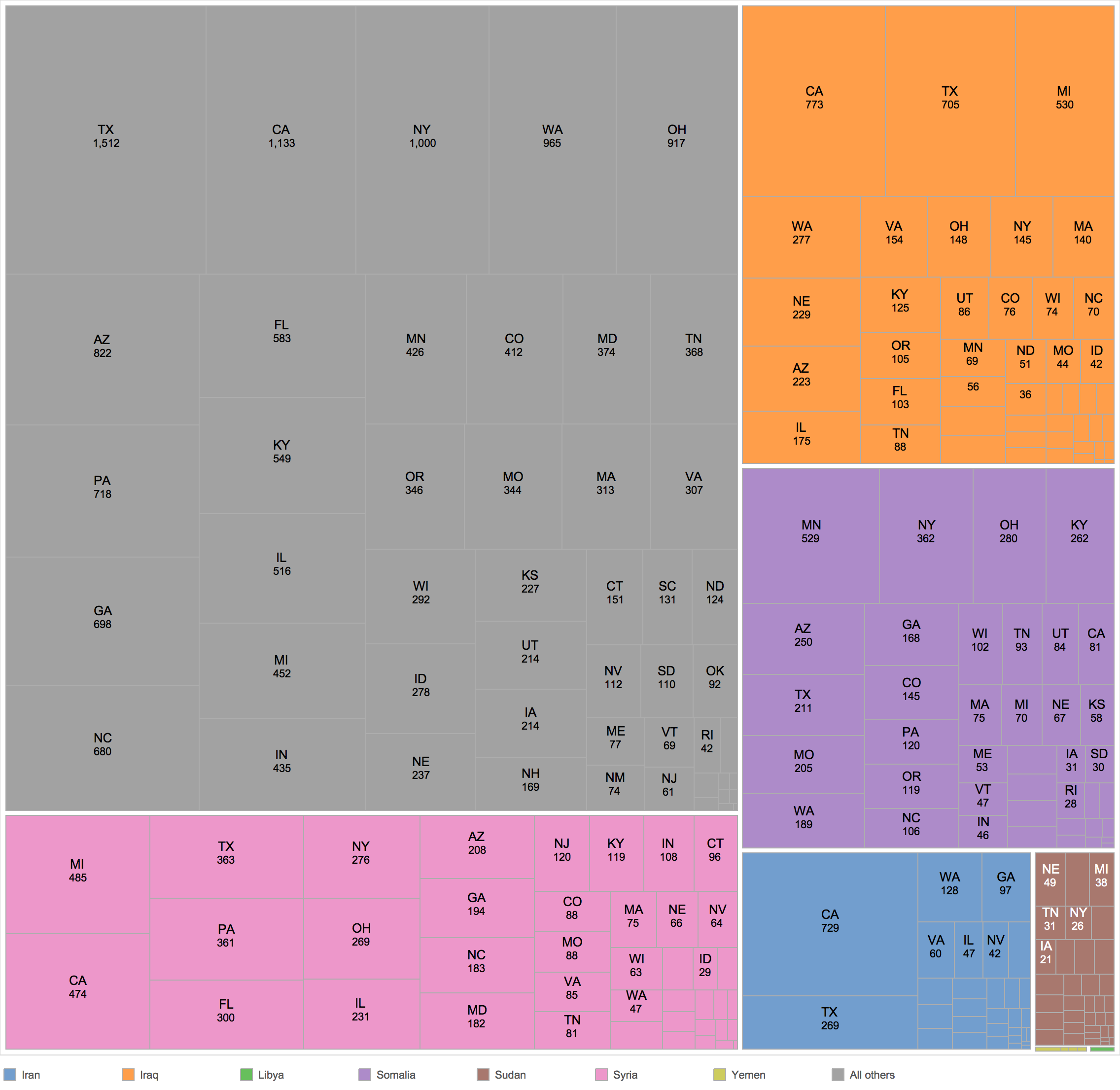
Number of refugees admitted from October 1, 2016 through January 31, 2017, and state settled in. National origin for 7 countries in Executive Order colored; all other countries grouped, in gray.

Donald Trump became the U.S. president on January 20, 2017. He has long claimed that terrorists are using the U.S. refugee resettlement program to enter the country. As a candidate Trump's "Contract with the American Voter" pledged to suspend immigration from "terror-prone regions". Trump-administration officials then described the executive order as fulfilling this campaign promise. Speaking of Trump's agenda as implemented through executive orders and the judicial appointment process, White House chief strategist Steve Bannon stated: "If you want to see the Trump agenda it's very simple. It was all in the [campaign] speeches. He's laid out an agenda with those speeches, with the promises he made, and [my and Reince Priebus'] job every day is to just to execute on that. He's maniacally focused on that."

During his initial election campaign Trump had proposed a temporary, conditional, and "total and complete" ban on Muslims entering the United States. His proposal was met by opposition by U.S. politicians including Mike Pence and James Mattis.

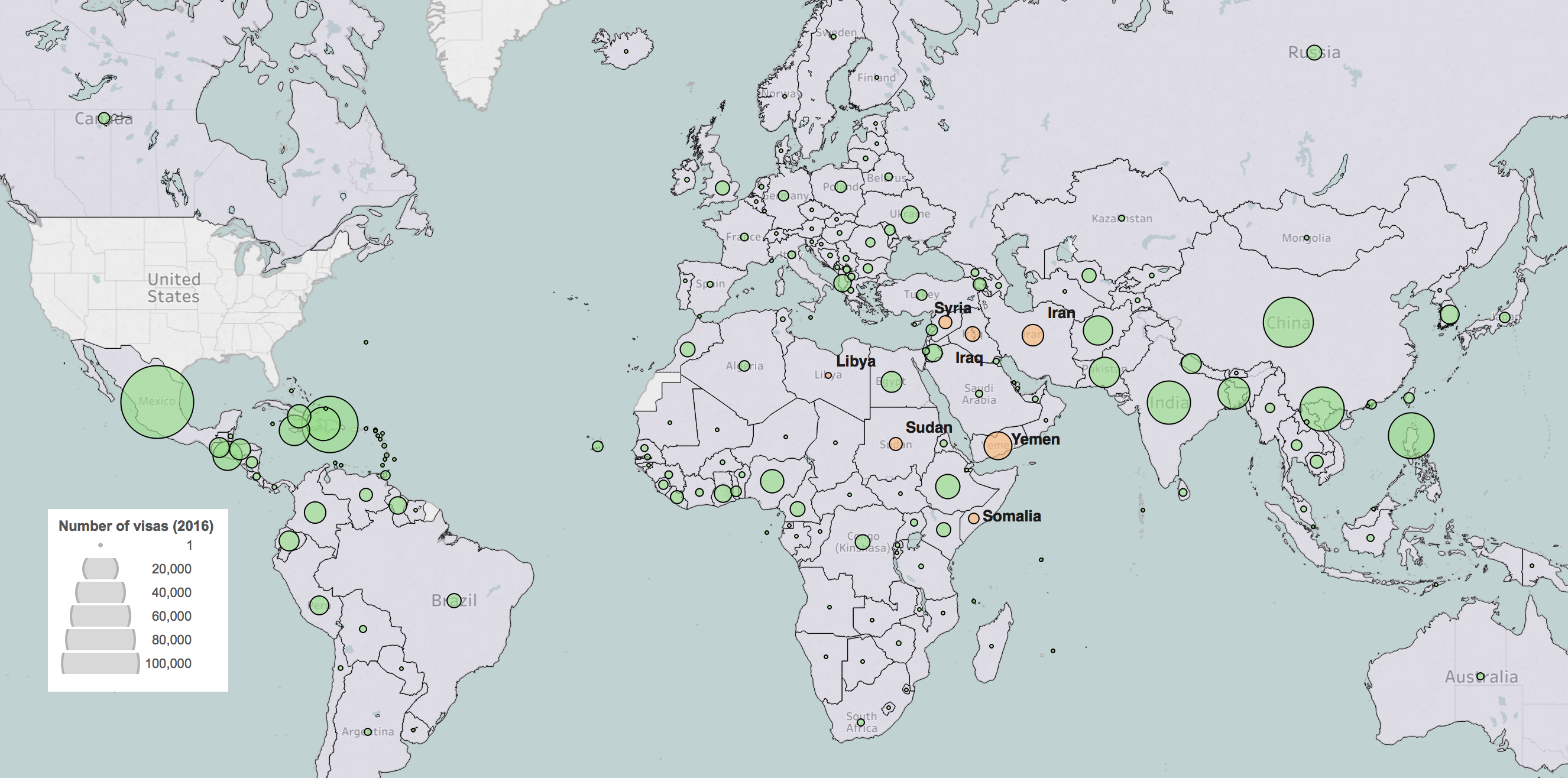
Visas by country in 2016, showing number issued by size, and countries selected in the Executive Order in orange, all others in green

On June 12, in reference to the Orlando nightclub shooting that occurred on the same date, Trump used Twitter to renew his call for a Muslim immigration ban. On June 13 Trump proposed to suspend immigration from "areas of the world" with a history of terrorism, a change from his previous proposal to suspend Muslim immigration to the U.S; the campaign did not announce the details of the plan at the time, but Jeff Sessions, an advisor to Trump campaign on immigration, said the proposal was a statement of purpose to be supplied with details in subsequent months.

On July 15, Pence, who as governor of Indiana attempted to suspend settlement of Syrian refugees to the state but was prevented from doing so by the courts, said that decision was based on the fall 2015 FBI assessment that there is risk associated with bringing in refugees. Pence cited the infiltration of Iraqi refugees in Bowling Green Kentucky who were arrested in 2011 for attempting to provide weapons to ISIS and Obama's suspension of the Iraqi refugee program in response as precedent for a U.S. President's "temporarily suspend[ing] immigration from countries where terrorist influence and impact represents a threat to the United States".

On July 17, Trump (with Pence) participated in an interview on 60 Minutes that sought to clarify whether Trump's position on a Muslim ban had changed; when asked whether he had changed position on the Muslim ban, he said: "—no, I—Call it whatever you want. We'll call it territories, OK?" Trump's response would later be interpreted by Judge Brinkema of the U.S. District Court for the Eastern District of Virginia as acknowledging "the conceptual link between a Muslim ban and the [executive order]" in her ruling finding the executive order likely violates the Establishment Clause of the U.S. Constitution.

In a speech on August 4 to a Maine audience Trump called for stopping the practice of admitting refugees from among the most dangerous places in the world; Trump specifically opposed Somali immigration to Minnesota and Maine, describing the Somali refugee program, which has resettled tens of thousands of refugees in the U.S., as creating "a rich pool of potential recruiting targets for Islamic terror groups". In Minnesota 10 men of Somali or Oromo family backgrounds were charged with conspiring to travel to the Middle East to join ISIS and 20 young men traveled to Somalia to join a terror group in 2007. Trump went on to list alleged terrorist plots by immigrants from Somalia, Yemen, Iraq, and Syria, along with incidents of alleged terrorism plots or acts by immigrants from countries not among the seven specified by the eventual executive order such as Pakistan, Afghanistan, the Philippines, Uzbekistan, and Morocco.

In a speech on August 15 Trump listed terrorism attacks in the United States (9/11; the 2009 Fort Hood shooting; the Boston Marathon bombing; the shootings in Chattanooga, Tennessee; and the Orlando nightclub shooting) as justification for his proposals for increased ideological testing and a temporary ban on immigration from countries with a history of terrorism; on this point, the Los Angeles Times' analysis observed Trump "failed to mention that a number of the attackers were U.S. citizens, or had come to the U.S. as children". (The same analysis also acknowledged an act of Congress eventually cited to in the executive order was probably what Trump would attempt to use in implementing such proposals. No deaths in the U.S. had been caused by extremists with family backgrounds in any of the seven countries implicated by the executive order as of the day before it was signed.) In the speech, Trump vowed to task the departments of State and Homeland Security to identify regions hostile to the United States such that the additional screening was justified to identify those who pose a threat.

In a speech on August 31 Trump vowed to "suspend the issuance of visas" to "places like Syria and Libya". On September 4 vice presidential candidate Mike Pence defended the Trump–Pence ticket's plan to suspend immigration from countries or regions of the world with a history of terrorism on Meet the Press. He gave Syria as an example of such a country or region: "Donald Trump and I believe that we should suspend the Syrian refugee program" because, Pence said, Syria was a region of the world that was "imploding into civil war" and had "been compromised by terrorism".

In late November following the Ohio State attack, President-elect Trump claimed the attacker was a "Somali refugee who should not have been in" the U.S. In early December he said the attack showed immigration security is national security when stating goals for his administration. The attacker injured 11 before he was killed by police. The attacker was a Somali-born refugee who spent seven years in Pakistan, the country from which he immigrated to the U.S. with his family on a refugee visa. The attacker was a legal permanent resident living in the U.S. reportedly inspired by but not in direct contact with ISIS. In an interview given for a feature in the Ohio State student newspaper approximately two months before the attack, the eventual attacker expressed fear about Donald Trump's rhetoric toward Muslims and what it might mean for immigrants and refugees.

In an interview broadcast the day he would sign the order President Trump told the Christian Broadcasting Network (CBN) that Christian refugees would be given priority in terms of refugee status in the United States after saying that Syrian Christians were "horribly treated" by his predecessor, Barack Obama. Christians make up very small fractions (0.1% to 1.5%) of the Syrian refugees who have registered with the UN High Commission for Refugees in Syria, Jordan, Iraq, and Lebanon; those registered represent the pool from which the U.S. selects refugees.

António Guterres, then-UN high commissioner for refugees, said in October 2015 that many Syrian Christians have ties to the Christian community in Lebanon and have sought the UN's services in smaller numbers. During 2016 the U.S. had admitted almost as many Christian as Muslim refugees. Pew research also pointed out that over 99% of admitted Syrian refugees were Muslim and less than 1% Christian, despite the demographics of Syria being estimated by Pew to be 93% Muslim and 5% Christian. Senator Chris Coons (D-DE) accused Trump of spreading "false facts" and "alternative facts".

In January 2016, the Department of Justice (DOJ), on request of the Senate Subcommittee on Immigration and the National Interest, provided a list of 580 public international terrorism and terrorism-related convictions from September 11, 2001 through the end of 2014. Based on this data and news reports and other open-source information the committee in June determined that at least 380 among the 580 convicted were foreign-born. The publicly released version of Trump's August 15 speech quoted that report. Alex Nowrasteh of the Cato Institute said the list of 580 convictions shared by DOJ was problematic in that "241 of the 580 convictions (42 percent) were not even for terrorism offences"; they started with a terrorism tip but ended up with a non-terrorism charge like "receiving stolen cereal". The day after Executive Order 13780 was signed, Ohio Congressman Bill Johnson said 60 individuals of the 380 foreign-born individuals or 580 total individuals (16% or 10%, respectively) were from the seven countries implicated by Executive Order 13769, but because Iraq is not among the six countries implicated in Executive Order 13780, Johnson suggested the number may be lower than 60 for countries implicated by that executive order. Nowrasteh notes 40 of the 580 individuals (6.9%) were foreign-born immigrants or non-immigrants convicted of planning, attempting, or carrying out terrorist attacks on U.S. soil (his analysis does not specify whether any, some, or all 40 are from the six or seven countries specified by executive orders 13780 or 13769). He contrasts this figure with EO 13780's statement that "[s]ince 2001, hundreds of persons born abroad have been convicted of terrorism-related crimes in the United States", which he says requires including planned acts outside the United States" because "If the people counted as 'terrorism-related' convictions were really convicted of planning, attempting, or carrying out a terrorist attack on U.S. soil then supporters of Trump's executive order would call them 'terrorism convictions' and exclude the [descriptor] 'related'."

== Development ==
Executive Order 13769 as published in Federal Register

Draft of Executive Order 13769

The New York Times said that candidate Trump in a speech on June 13, 2016, read from statutory language to justify the President's authority to suspend immigration from areas of the world with a history of terrorism. The Washington Post identified the referenced statute as 8 U.S.C. 1182(f). This was the statutory subsection eventually cited in sections 3, 5, and 6 of the executive order.

According to CNN, the executive order was developed primarily by White House officials (which the Los Angeles Times reported as including "major architect" Stephen Miller and Steve Bannon) without input from the U.S. Department of Justice's Office of Legal Counsel (OLC) that is typically a part of the drafting process. This was disputed by White House officials. The OLC usually reviews all executive orders with respect to form and legality before issuance. The White House under previous administrations, including the Obama administration, has bypassed or overruled the OLC on sensitive matters of national security.

Trump aides said that the order had been issued in consultation with Department of Homeland Security and State Department officials. Officials at the State Department and other agencies said it was not. An official from the Trump administration said that parts of the order had been developed in the transition period between Trump's election and his inauguration. CNN reported that Homeland Security Secretary John Kelly and Department of Homeland Security leadership saw the details shortly before the order was finalized.

On January 31 John Kelly told reporters that he "did know it was under development" and had seen at least two drafts of the order. (Note: With the final draft, two drafts of the order were public by the time the order was released on January 27. See prior leaked draft of order, which was public on January 25.) James Mattis, for the Department of Defense, did not see a final version of the order until the morning of the day President Trump signed it (the signing occurred shortly after Mattis' swearing-in ceremony for secretary of defense in the afternoon) and the White House did not offer Mattis the chance to provide input while the order was drafted. Rex Tillerson, though not yet confirmed as secretary of state, was involved in cabinet-level discussions about implementation of the order at least as early as 2:00 a.m. Sunday, January 29. According to the Department of Homeland Security Office of Inspector General, the only people at DHS who saw the executive order before it was signed were Kelly and DHS's acting general counsel, who was first shown the order one hour in advance of signing. The DHS inspector general found that U.S. Customs and Border Protection was not sent a draft of the order and that acting commissioner Kevin McAleenan received most of his information on the order from congressional staffers.

White House cyber security adviser Rudy Giuliani said on Fox News that President Trump came to him for guidance over the order. He said that Trump called him about a "Muslim ban" and asked him to form a committee to show him "the right way to do it legally". The committee, which included former U.S. attorney general and chief judge of the Southern District of New York Michael Mukasey and representatives Mike McCaul and Peter T. King, decided to drop the religious basis and instead focus on regions where, as Giuliani put it, there is "substantial evidence that people are sending terrorists" to the United States. Nongovernment research does indicate foreign nationals from the affected countries in the travel ban have been arrested and implicated in terrorist plots since 9/11; it also indicates there have been no deaths in the United States caused by extremists with family backgrounds in those affected countries.

== Provisions ==
OLC opinion on legal form review

The version of the executive order posted at the White House website differs from the Presidentially approved order published by the Federal Register.

Section 1, describing the purpose of the order, invoked the September 11 attacks, stating that then State Department policy prevented consular officers from properly scrutinizing the visa applications of the attackers. However, none of the September 11 hijackers were from any of the seven banned countries. When announcing his executive action, Trump made similar references to the attacks several times.

The order excluded countries of origin of radicalized Muslim perpetrators of attacks against the United States, such as Saudi Arabia, Lebanon, the United Arab Emirates, Pakistan, Russia and Kyrgyzstan. It also did not include any Muslim countries where the Trump Organization had conducted business, such as the United Arab Emirates and Turkey. Political activist and legal scholar David G. Post opined in The Washington Post that Trump had "allowed business interests to interfere with his public policy making", and called for his impeachment.

=== Visitors, immigrants, and refugees ===
Section 3 of the order blocks entry of people from Iran, Iraq, Libya, Somalia, Sudan, Syria, and Yemen, for at least 90 days, regardless of whether or not they hold valid non-diplomatic visas. This order affects about 218 million people who are citizens of these countries. After 90 days a list of additional countries—not just those specified by a subparagraph (Note: 8 U.S.C. § 1187(a)(12)) of the Immigration and Nationality Act (INA)—must be prepared. The cited portion of the INA refers to aliens who have been present in or are nationals of Iraq, Syria, and other countries designated by the Secretary of State. Citing Section 3(c) of the executive order, Deputy Assistant Secretary of State for Consular Affairs Edward J. Ramotowski issued a notice that "provisionally revoke[s] all valid nonimmigrant and immigrant visas of nationals" of the designated countries.

The secretary of homeland security, in consultation with the secretary of state and the director of national intelligence, must conduct a review to determine the information needed from any country to adjudicate any visa, admission, or any other benefit under the INA. Within 30 days the secretary of homeland security must list countries that do not provide adequate information. The foreign governments then have 60 days to provide the information on their nationals after which the secretary of homeland security must submit to the president a list of countries recommended for inclusion on a presidential proclamation that would prohibit the entry of foreign nationals from countries that do not provide the information.

Section 5 suspends the U.S. Refugee Admissions Program (USRAP) for at least 120 days but stipulates that the program can be resumed for citizens of the specified countries if the secretary of state, secretary of homeland security and the director of national intelligence agree to do so. The suspension for Syrian refugees is indefinite. The number of new refugees allowed in 2017 is capped to 50,000 (reduced from 110,000). After the resumption of USRAP refugee applications will be prioritized based on religion-based persecutions only in the case that the religion of the individual is a minority religion in that country.

The order said that the secretaries of state and homeland security may, on a case-by-case basis and when in the national interest, issue visas or other immigration benefits to nationals of countries for which visas and benefits are otherwise blocked. Section 7 calls for an expedited completion and implementation of a biometric entry/exit tracking system for all travelers coming into the United States, without reference to whether they are foreigners or not. (The similar provision in Section 8 of Executive Order 13780 is limited to in-scope travelers, which in 2016 were defined by DHS with respect to biometric entry/exit as all non-U.S. citizens with the ages of 14–79. See Executive Order 13780 at § Effect.) Section 7 orders DHS to follow the recommendation of the 9/11 Commission, which recommended in the 9/11 Commission Report, that a biometric entry and exist system be created and implemented.

Secretary of Homeland Security John Kelly has stated to Congress that DHS is considering a requirement that refugees and visa applicants reveal social media passwords as part of security screening. The idea was one of many to strengthen border security, as well as requesting financial records. In 2011 the Obama administration released a memo revealing a similar plan to vet social media accounts for visa applicants. John Kelly has stated that the temporary ban is important and that the DHS is developing what "extreme vetting" might look like.

=== Green-card holders ===
There was some early confusion about the status of green-card holders (i.e., lawful permanent residents). According to the lawsuit filed by the states of Washington and Minnesota, dated February 3, the government had changed its position five times to date. Initially, on the evening of Friday January 27, the Department of Homeland Security sent out a guidance to airlines stated "lawful permanent residents are not included and may continue to travel to the USA". CNN reported that it was overruled by the White House overnight. Early Saturday, January 28, the Department of Homeland Security's acting press secretary Gillian Christensen said in an e-mail to Reuters that the order barred green-card holders from the affected countries. By Saturday afternoon White House officials said they would need a case-by-case waiver to return. On Sunday White House chief of staff Reince Priebus said that green-card holders would not be prevented from returning to the United States.

According to the Associated Press, no green-card holders were ultimately denied entry to the U.S. although several initially spent "long hours" in detention. On January 29, Secretary of Homeland Security John Kelly deemed entry of lawful permanent residents into the U.S. to be "in the national interest" exempting them from the ban according to the provisions of the executive order. On February 1, White House counsel Don McGahn issued a memorandum to the heads of the departments of State, Justice, and Homeland Security clarifying that the ban-provisions of the executive order do not apply to lawful permanent residents. Press Secretary Sean Spicer said that green-card holders from affected countries "no longer need a waiver because, if they are a legal permanent resident, they won't need it anymore".

=== Dual citizens ===
There was similar confusion about whether the order affected dual citizens of a banned country and a non-banned country. The State Department said that the order did not affect U.S. citizens who also hold citizenship of one of the seven banned countries. On January 28, the State Department stated that other travelers with dual nationality of one of these countries—for example, an Iranian who also holds a Canadian passport—would not be permitted to enter. However, the International Air Transport Association told their airlines that dual nationals who hold a passport from a non-banned country would be allowed in.

The United Kingdom's Foreign and Commonwealth Office issued a press release that the restrictions apply to those traveling from the listed countries not those that merely have their citizenship. The confusion led companies and institutions to take a more cautious approach; for example, Google told its dual-national employees to stay in the United States until more clarity could be provided. On January 31, the State Department updated the restrictions to allow persons holding dual citizenship to enter the US provided they possessed a US visa and entered using a passport from an unrestricted country.

=== All entrants who are subject to adjudication ===
Section 4 orders development of a uniform screening procedure as part of the adjudication process for immigration benefits; components of the screening procedure are suggested but not determined. Section 1 ("Purpose") requires screening to identify those who would "place violent ideologies higher than American law" or "oppress Americans of any ... gender or sexual orientation". The only suggested component of the uniform screening procedure in section 4 that specifically mentions a potential entrant's mindset is "a mechanism to assess whether or not the applicant has the intent to commit criminal or terrorist acts after entering the United States". Trump's August 15 speech proposed an ideological test for all immigrants to screen out people who might harbor violent or oppressive attitudes toward women or gays. In response, immigration expert Stephen Yale-Loehr suggested that an ideological test could involve screening immigration applicants' social media pages as part of a routine background check. The Trump administration has formally proposed adding optional collection of social media account information for visa applicants from China affecting approximately 3.6 million people annually. DHS has publicly proposed to ask some entrants for social media passwords and financial records, barring entry to those who do not comply; it regards the information as particularly important for vetting entrants from states such as Somalia and Syria, whose governments have poorer records systems. According to Sophia Cope, a lawyer for the Electronic Frontier Foundation, foreign nationals may be denied entry to the U.S. for refusing to turn over device passwords, and the law is not clear for permanent residents; device passwords may be used to access social media when the user is logged in to the social media account. Part (b) of Section 4 requires the departments of State and Homeland Security, the Director of National Intelligence, and the FBI to present progress reports on the uniform screening procedure to the President, the first of which is due 60 days from the date the order was issued.

=== Deleted provision regarding safe zones in Syria ===
A leaked prior draft of the order (published by The Washington Post before the order went into effect) would have ordered that "the Secretary of State, in conjunction with the Secretary of Defense, is directed within 90 days of the date of this order to produce a plan to provide safe areas in Syria and in the surrounding region in which Syrian nationals displaced from their homeland can await firm settlement, such as repatriation or potential third-country resettlement." This provision was omitted from the final order. Rex Tillerson, Trump's secretary of state, had not yet taken office at the time the executive order went into effect.

During and after his campaign Trump proposed establishing safe zones in Syria as an alternative to Syrian refugees' immigration to the U.S. In the past "safe zones" have been interpreted as establishing, among other things, no-fly zones over Syria. During the Obama administration, Turkey encouraged the U.S. to establish safe zones; the Obama administration was concerned about the potential for pulling the U.S. into a war with Russia.

In the first weeks of Trump's presidency Turkey renewed its call for safe zones and proposed a new plan for them, the Trump administration has spoken with several other Sunni Arab States regarding safe zones, and Russia has asked for clarification regarding any Trump administration plan regarding safe zones. The UN High Commissioner on Refugees and Bashar al-Assad have dismissed safe zones as unworkable.

== Impact ==
=== Terrorism ===
Trump's stated reason for issuing the executive order was to prevent terrorism. An internal report compiled by the U.S. Department of Homeland Security Intelligence and Analysis Unit, however, concluded that people from the seven nations affected by the travel ban pose no increased terror risk. The report found that "country of citizenship is unlikely to be a reliable indicator of potential terrorist activity" and that few individuals from the seven affected countries access the U.S. in any case, since the State Department grants a small number of visas to citizens of those countries." The report found that of 82 people determined to have inspired by a foreign terrorist organization "to carry out or try to carry out an attack in the United States, just over half were U.S. citizens born in the United States," while the rest came from a group of 26 countries, only two of which were among the seven nations included in the ban. White House and DHS officials downplayed the significance of the report, saying it was only a draft.

The New York Times reported that "for an action aimed at terrorism, the order appeared to garner little or no support among experts and former officials of every political stripe with experience in the field." Experts on terrorism, such as Charles Kurzman of the University of North Carolina, Brian Michael Jenkins of the RAND Corporation, and Daniel Benjamin of Dartmouth College, formerly the State Department's top counterterrorism official, all commented upon the order. Benjamin said that the order was unlikely to reduce the terrorist threat, and "many experts believe the order's unintended consequences will make the threat worse." Kurzman noted that since the September 11 attacks in 2001, no one has been killed in the U.S. in a terrorist attack by anyone who emigrated from or whose parents emigrated from the seven affected countries. Jenkins explained that of the 147 Jihadist plots and attacks since 9/11, 105 were perpetrated by U.S. citizens and 20 involved legal permanent residents. "In other words, 85 percent of the terrorists lived in the U.S. a long time before carrying out an attack—they were radicalized within the nation's borders." Jenkins went on to say: "Had this temporary prohibition been in effect since 9/11, how many lives would have been saved? Not one." While Jenkins conceded that there were two individuals whose entry would have been prevented had the ban been in place since 9/11, both were in the country for years prior to engaging in terrorist related activities. According to Jenkins, the "... failure to identify these individuals before they entered the United States is not a flaw in the vetting process; it is our inability to predict human behavior years into the future."

According to The New York Times reporter Scott Shane, the seven countries in the executive order had a "random quality"; the list excluded Saudi Arabia and Egypt (where many jihadist groups were founded) and Pakistan and Afghanistan (where extremism has a long history, and which have "produced militants who have occasionally reached the United States"). Benjamin stated that the order might be counterproductive in terms of counterterrorism cooperation and feeding into "the jihadist narrative" of a West at war with Islam. Jonathan Schanzer of the conservative Foundation for Defense of Democracies said that "The order appears to be based mainly on a campaign promise," and did not appear to be tied to any effort to improve vetting or other procedures.

A 2021 study in the American Political Science Review found that Trump's refugee ban (which caused a 66% reduction in refugee resettlement) had no impact on crime rates.

=== Implementation at airports ===
Shortly after the enactment of the executive order, at 4:42 pm on January 27, border officials across the country began enforcing the new rules. The New York Times reported people with various backgrounds and statuses being denied entry or sent back; this included refugees and minority Christians from the affected countries as well as students and green-card holders returning to the United States after visits abroad.

People from the countries mentioned in the order with valid visas were turned away from flights to the U.S. Some were stranded in a foreign country while in transit. Several people already on planes flying to the U.S. at the time the order was signed were detained on arrival. On January 28 the American Civil Liberties Union (ACLU) estimated that there were 100 to 200 people being detained in U.S. airports, and hundreds were barred from boarding U.S.-bound flights. About 60 legal permanent residents were reported as detained at Dulles International Airport near Washington, D.C. Travelers were also detained at O'Hare International Airport without access to their cellphones and unable to access legal assistance. The Council on American-Islamic Relations (CAIR) offers free legal help to travelers who experience problems with the "ban". Attorneys are stationed, around the clock, at the Chicago airport and CAIR also encourages travelers to register with them, prior to travel. The Department of Homeland Security (DHS) said on January 28 that the order was applied to "less than one percent" of the 325,000 air travelers who arrived in the United States. By January 29 DHS estimated that 375 travelers had been affected with 109 travelers in transit and another 173 prevented from boarding flights. In some airports there were reports that Border Patrol agents were requesting access to travelers' social media accounts.

On February, 3 attorneys for the DOJ's Office of Immigration Litigation advised a judge hearing one of the legal challenges to the order that more than 100,000 visas have been revoked as a consequence of the order. They also advised the judge that no legal permanent residents have been denied entry. The State Department later revised this figure downward to fewer than 60,000 revoked visas and clarified that the larger DOJ figure incorrectly included visas that were exempted from the travel ban (such as diplomatic visas) and expired visas.

=== Number of affected people ===
On January 30, Trump said on Twitter "Only 109 people ... were detained and held for questioning"; Homeland Security officials later said this number referred to the initial hours of the order's implementation. On January 31, Customs and Border Protection (CBP) reported that 721 people were detained or denied boarding under the order; CBP also reported 1,060 waivers for green-card holders had been processed; 75 waivers had been granted for persons with immigrant and nonimmigrant visas; and 872 waivers for refugees had been granted. On February 23, the Justice Department provided the ACLU with a list of 746 people who were detained or processed by CBP during the twenty-six hours from Judge Ann Donnelly's ruling at 9:37pm on January 28 to 11:59pm on January 29; the ACLU has identified at least 10 people meeting this description who are not on the list they received. Detentions continued at Chicago's O'Hare airport on January 30.

The effect of the order was far broader, however, than the number of people detained. In terms of barred visa-holders, the federal government reported that more than "100,000 visas for foreigners inside and outside the United States have also been revoked, at least temporarily." The Washington Post fact-checker, citing State Department figures, reported that 60,000 U.S. visas were issued in the seven affected countries in fiscal year 2015. The New York Times reported that 86,000 nonimmigrant-temporary visas (mostly for tourism, business travel, temporary work, or education) have been granted to citizens in the seven affected countries in the 2015 fiscal year. The executive order also barred people from the seven countries from obtaining new immigrant visas. In 2015, 52,365 people from the seven affected countries had been issued green cards (which are typically awarded soon after the arrival of an immigrant visa-holder to the United States); "[i]n general, about half of recent new legal permanent residents are new arrivals to the country, and the other half had their status adjusted after living in the United States."

In the weeks of 2017 prior to the executive order, the U.S. admitted approximately 1,800 refugees per week (total) from the seven countries covered by the order. While the executive order was in effect, the U.S. received two refugees from those countries.

=== Impact on U.S. industry ===
Google called its traveling employees back to the U.S. in case the order prevented them from returning. About 100 of the company's employees were thought to be affected by the order. Google CEO Sundar Pichai wrote in a letter to his staff that "it's painful to see the personal cost of this executive order on our colleagues. We've always made our view on immigration issues known publicly and will continue to do so." Amazon.com Inc., citing disruption in travel for its employees, and Expedia Inc., citing impact to its customers and refund costs, filed declarations in support of the states of Washington and Minnesota in their case against the executive order, Washington v. Trump.

However, Committee for Economic Development CEO Steve Odland and several other executives and analysts commented that the order will not lead to significant changes in IT hiring practices among US companies, since the countries affected are not the primary source of foreign talent. According to the Hill "a cross-section of legal experts and travel advocates" say that the order "could have a chilling effect on U.S. tourism, global business and enrollment in American universities".

One effect of Trump's election and policies, and in particular, Trump's executive order, is the "Trump Slump" on the U.S. tourism industry, which contributed $1.47 (~$1.97 trillion in 2025) trillion to the country's GDP in 2014. As reported by Frommer's, according to Global Business Travel Association, as well as local tourist offices, with policies such as Executive Order 13769 making foreigners feeling less welcome, fewer tourists began traveling to the U.S., with all foreign tourism down 6.8%, online searches for flights from foreign countries down 17%, and foreign business travel dropping by $185 million during the first week of the immigration suspension. Economic Research Firm Oxford Economics found that Los Angeles County could lose 800,000 visitors—who would otherwise account for $736 million (~$949 million in 2025) in tourism spending— as a direct result of the ban.

=== Travelers and patients ===
According to Trita Parsi, the president of the National Iranian American Council, the order distressed citizens of the affected countries including those holding valid green cards and valid visas. Those outside the U.S. fear that they will not be allowed in, while those already in the country fear that they will not be able to leave, even temporarily, because they would not be able to return.

Some sources have stated that the executive order, if upheld, is likely to contribute to a doctor shortage in the United States, disproportionately affecting rural areas and underprovided specialties. According to an analysis by a Harvard Medical School group of professors, research analysts and physicians, the executive order is likely to reduce the number of physicians in the United States as approximately 5% of the foreign-trained physicians in the United States were trained in the seven countries targeted by the executive order. These doctors are disproportionately likely to practice medicine in rural, underserved regions and specialties facing a large shortage of practitioners. According to The Medicus Firm, which recruits doctors for hard-to-fill jobs, Trump's executive order covers more than 15,000 physicians in the United States.

=== Impact on education ===
Many universities were impacted by the issuance of the travel ban. One example is Bennington College. Since nearly twenty percent of students are from around the world, some students were not allowed to return. Even students who planned to attend this college in the future were unable to. Universities like New York University, updated its students on each iteration of the travel ban to keep students educated on what they can do if they are affected by the order. Many university administrators believe that due to President Trump's view on immigration, students abroad have become reluctant to study in the United States.

Students that have the F1 visa are put at risk with this executive order. Since F1 visas only allow these visa holders one-entry into the United States, this executive order may not allow these individuals to come back if they decide to leave the country for a school break. Due to the ban, the students on F1 visas may not be able to see their families for several years especially if their parents cannot enter the United States as a result of the ban.

== Timeline ==
Year	Month	Day	Events	Details
2017	01	27	Issuance of executive order	
2017	01	28	Release of two deported travelers	Once the ban had started, 2 individuals were released from Customs and Border Protection.
2017	01	29	National warrant granted to block deportation in airports	A New York federal judge accepted a request from the American Civil Liberties Union to protest those stranded in airports.
2017	03	06	A new executive order	People who have green cards and visas were freed. Iraq is removed from the order. See Executive Order 13780 for details.
2017	07	19	Supreme Court gives immunity for some relatives	Includes grandparents, grandchildren, brothers-in-law, sisters-in-law, nieces, nephews, aunts, and uncles of anyone in the United States.
2018	06	26	Supreme Court upholds third version of the executive order.	

== Reactions ==
Trump on refugee order: "It's not a Muslim ban" (video from Voice of America)

Democrats "were nearly united in their condemnation" of the policy with opposition from Senate minority leader Charles Schumer (D-NY), senators Bernie Sanders (I-VT) and Kamala Harris (D-CA), former U.S. secretaries of state Madeleine Albright and Hillary Clinton, and former president Barack Obama. Some Republicans praised the order with Speaker of the House Paul Ryan saying that Trump was "right to make sure we are doing everything possible to know exactly who is entering our country" while noting that he supported the refugee resettlement program. However, some top Republicans in Congress criticized the order. A statement from senators John McCain and Lindsey Graham cited the confusion that the order caused and the fact that the "order went into effect with little to no consultation with the departments of State, Defense, Justice, and Homeland Security". Senator Susan Collins also objected to the ban. Some 1,000 career U.S. diplomats signed a "dissent cable" (memorandum) outlining their disagreement with the order, sending it through the State Department's Dissent Channel, in what is believed to be the largest number to ever sign on to a dissent cable. Over 40 Nobel laureates, among many academics, also opposed the order. Polls of the American public's opinion of the order were mixed, with some polls showing majority opposition and others showing majority support. Public responses often depended on the wording of polling questions. Some critics accused the order of being a "Muslim ban" because the order only targeted Muslim-majority countries, because Trump's advisers called it a "Muslim ban", and Trump himself equated the order to a Muslim ban on at least 12 occasions.

March 1, 2017 DHS Intelligence Assessment Showing No Threat

The order prompted broad condemnation from the international community including longstanding U.S. allies and the United Nations. Canadian prime minister Justin Trudeau stated that Canada would continue to welcome refugees regardless of their faith. British prime minister Theresa May was initially reluctant to condemn the policy, having just met with Trump the day prior, saying that "the United States is responsible for the United States policy on refugees", but said she "did not agree" with the approach. France, Germany and Turkey condemned the order. Some media outlets said Australian prime minister Malcolm Turnbull avoided public comment on the order, with Turnbull saying it was "not my job" to criticize it. However, Australian opinion soured after a tweet by Trump appeared to question a refugee deal already agreed by Turnbull and Obama. Iran's Ministry of Foreign Affairs characterized Trump's order as insulting to the Islamic world and counter-productive in the attempt to combat extremism. The commander of the Iraqi Air Force said he is "worried and surprised", as the ban may affect Iraqi security forces members (such as Iraqi pilots being trained in US) who are on the front-lines of fighting ISIS terrorism. However, traditional US allies in the region were largely silent. On February 1, the United Arab Emirates became the first Muslim-majority nation to back the order.

Some Catholic leaders condemned the ban and encouraged mercy and compassion towards refugees. The executive director of the Baptist Joint Committee for Religious Liberty, Amanda Tyler, stated that the executive order was "a back-door bar on Muslim refugees." The director of the Alliance of Baptists, Paula Clayton Dempsey, urged support for U.S. resettlement of refugees. Members of the Southern Baptist Convention were largely supportive of the executive order. The Economist noted that the order was signed on International Holocaust Remembrance Day. This, as well as Trump's omission of any reference to Jews or anti-Semitism in his concurrent address for Holocaust Remembrance Day and the ban's possible effect on Muslim refugees, led to condemnation from Jewish organizations, including the Anti-Defamation League, the HIAS, and J Street, as well as some Holocaust survivors.

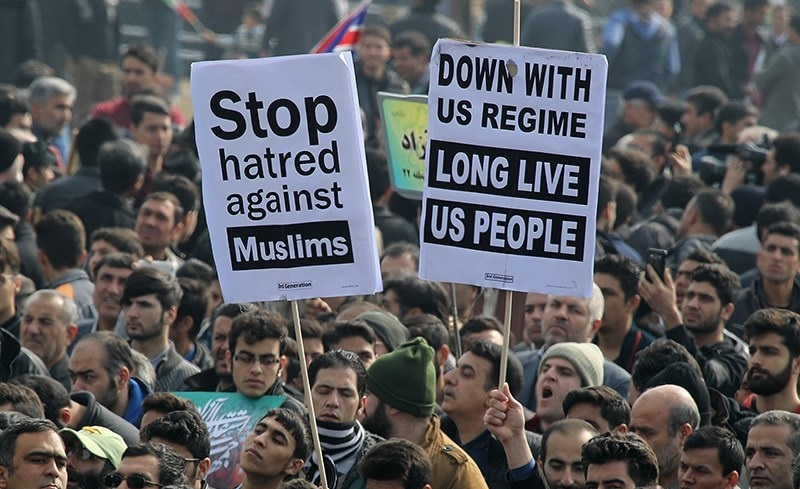
Protestors in Tehran, Iran, February 10, 2017

Polls found that a majority of Americans (55%) supported Trump's travel ban on visitors from six predominantly Muslim countries. Other polls showed 34% of Britons would back similar restrictions in the UK. Some European far-right groups and politicians, such as Geert Wilders and French presidential candidate Marine Le Pen, applauded the executive order. Some "alt-right" groups, as well as white nationalists and the Ku Klux Klan also praised the executive order.

Jihadist and Islamic terrorist groups celebrated the executive order as a victory saying that "the new policy validates their claim that the United States is at war with Islam." ISIS-linked social media postings "compared the executive order to the U.S. invasion of Iraq in 2003, which Islamic militant leaders at the time hailed as a 'blessed invasion' that ignited anti-Western fervor across the Islamic world."

=== Protests at airports ===
Trump immigration order sparks protests at New York's JFK international airport (report from Voice of America)

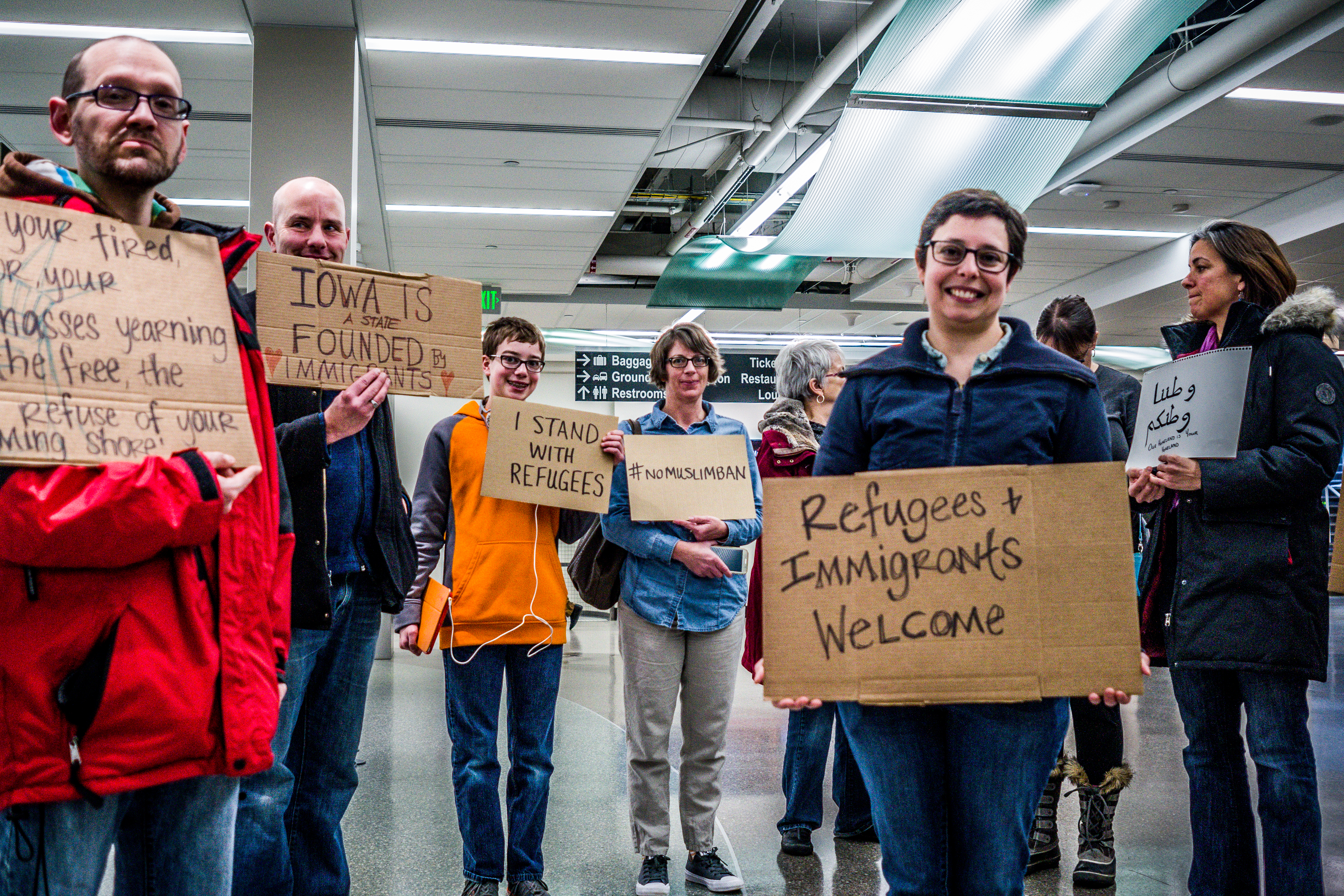
Protesters at Des Moines International Airport, Iowa

The protests initially started in the JFK airport in New York and rapidly spread to other cities in the United States. From January 28, thousands of protesters gathered at airports and other locations throughout the United States to protest the signing of the order and detention of the foreign nationals. Members of the United States Congress, including U.S. senator Elizabeth Warren (D-MA) and U.S. Representative John Lewis (D-GA) joined protests in their own home states. Google co-founder Sergey Brin (who emigrated to the United States with his family from the Soviet Union at the age of five) and Y Combinator president Sam Altman joined the protest at San Francisco airport. There were several online protests, and many people spoke out on social media. Virginia governor Terry McAuliffe joined the protest at Dulles International Airport on Saturday.

== Social media presence ==
Following Trump's announcement of the order, the topic began to trend on social media. Hashtags such as #MuslimBan, #TravelBan and #BanTrumpFromUK emerged. Shortly after, protests arose urging for the cancellation of Trump's UK visit, garnering up to 1.5 million signatures.

On January 30, Trump tweeted "Only 109 people out of 325,000 were detained and held for questioning. Big problems at airports were caused by Delta computer outage..." He continued on in another tweet, "protesters and the tears of Senator Chuck Schumer. Secretary John F. Kelly said that all is going well with very few problems. MAKE AMERICA SAFE AGAIN!".

Celebrities, including Seth Rogen, Mindy Kaling, Jennifer Lawrence, Bruce Springsteen, Yara Shahidi and many others expressed their opinions on the order.

=== #MuslimBan ===
On June 13, Trump proposed to suspend immigration from "areas of the world" with a history of terrorism, a change from his previous proposal to suspend Muslim immigration to the U.S. The hashtag became popular on Twitter and opposition to the executive order widely spread among all social media platforms.

=== #GrandParentsNotTerrorists ===
Under the new policy, citizens from Libya, Syria, Iran, Somalia, Yemen and Sudan would be banned from entering the U.S. if they couldn't prove that they have a "bona fide relationship" with families in America, which excludes grandparents, aunts, uncles or any other "distant relatives." To express the opposition to the order, the hashtag #GrandParentsNotTerrorists was launched by the National Iranian American Council (NIAC). The hashtag allowed residents of the six countries to use Twitter and post photos of their grandparents to protest the policy.

=== #NoBanNoWall ===
On January 24, 2017, the hashtag "#NoBanNoWall" first was seen on social media platform Twitter quickly after Donald Trump released news of executive order 13769. The use of social media platforms such as Twitter, Facebook, and Instagram became a catalyst for an opposition movement that resulted in political mobilization and awareness of the issue.

The #nobannowall movement has been used in multiple social media platforms such as Twitter, Facebook, Tumblr, Instagram, Flickr and more. On January 25, 2017 protesters gathered at Washington Square Park in New York and chanted: "No ban, no wall". These chants were soon used in Twitter as #nobannowall to protest President Trump's border wall and Muslim ban policies. As the hashtag became popular on Twitter it was used on other social media platforms. There are multiple Facebook groups and pages on #nobannowall along with events that were created for protests at various locations. There are currently 276K posts on Instagram with the hashtag #nobannowall and this shows the use of various social media platforms for this social movement.

Conservative supporters of the wall and executive order responded with social media support of hashtags #BuildTheWall and #BanTheMuslims, among others.

=== #RefugeeCaravan ===
The refugee caravan was the several thousands of migrants that traveled a long way to the US-Mexico border trying to enter America. About 7,000 migrants have reached the border and are staying in shelters. President Trump has labeled this caravan as "an invasion." It was also reported that many Mexican citizens saw the migrants as an invasion as well, where marches were organized against the undocumented migrants being in the city.

Supporters have argued that #RefugeeCaravan helped spread awareness of hardships immigrants went through in their journey to the United States. Although this movement did not directly spark from the executive order, it is a movement that followed the events of the travel ban. The movements that emerged from this executive order and from #RefugeeCaravan were started from the same foundational belief that all people should not have to be restricted into entering the United States. Tweets updated followers of the movement on who which asylum seekers were granted entry into the United States.

== Legal challenges ==
State attorney general signed vow to oppose the order State actively challenging order All of the above

Legal challenges to the order were brought almost immediately after its issuance. From January 28 to 31 almost 50 cases were filed in federal courts. The courts, in turn, granted temporary relief, including a nationwide temporary restraining order (TRO) that bars the enforcement of major parts of the executive order. The TRO specifically blocked the executive branch from enforcing provisions of the executive order that (1) suspend entry into the U.S. for people from seven countries for 90 days and (2) place limitations on the acceptance of refugees, including "any action that prioritizes the refugee claims of certain religious minorities." The TRO also allowed "people from the seven countries who had been authorized to travel, along with vetted refugees from all nations, to enter the country." The Trump administration appealed the TRO. According to the DHS inspector general, U.S. Customs and Border Protection officers then violated the court orders by continuing to prevent some foreign passengers from boarding flights bound for the United States. DHS officials contest the DHS inspector general's finding that the court orders were violated.

The plaintiffs challenging the order argued that it contravened the United States Constitution, federal statutes, or both. The parties challenging the executive order included both private individuals (some of whom were blocked from entering the U.S. or detained following the executive order's issuance) and the states of Washington and Minnesota, represented by their state attorneys general. Other organizations such as the ACLU also challenged the order in court. Additionally, fifteen Democratic state attorneys general released a joint statement calling the executive order "unconstitutional, un-American and unlawful", and that "[w]e'll work together to fight it".

Washington v. Trump hearing and bench ruling granting temporary restraining order (TRO)

In response to the lawsuits, the Department of Homeland Security issued a statement on January 29 that it would continue to enforce the executive order and that "prohibited travel will remain prohibited". On the same day a White House spokesperson said that the rulings did not undercut the executive order. On January 30 Acting Attorney General Sally Yates, an Obama administration holdover pending the confirmation of Trump's nominee barred the Justice Department from defending the executive order in court; She said she felt the order's effects were not in keeping "with this institution's solemn obligation to always seek justice and stand for what is right". After Yates spoke against Trump's refugee ban Trump quickly relieved her of her duties calling her statement a "betrayal" to the Department of Justice. He replaced her with Dana J. Boente, the United States attorney for the Eastern District of Virginia. This leadership alteration was referred to, by some, as "the Monday Night Massacre".

Audio from WA State v. Trump from the U.S. Court of Appeals for the Ninth Circuit

DHS Intelligence Document showing no threats from countries in Trump's Travel Ban

The state of Washington filed a legal challenge, Washington v. Trump, against the executive order; Minnesota later joined the case. On February 3 District judge James Robart of the United States District Court for the Western District of Washington presiding in Washington v. Trump issued a ruling temporarily blocking major portions of the executive order; he said that the plaintiffs had "demonstrate[d] immediate and irreparable injury", and were likely to succeed in their challenge to the federal defendants. Robart explicitly wrote his judgment to apply nationwide. In response to Robart's ruling the Department of Homeland Security said on February 4 that it had stopped enforcing the executive order, while the State Department reinstated visas that had been previously suspended.

That same day the Justice Department asked for an emergency stay to reverse Judge Robart's ruling temporarily blocking the executive order nationwide. The United States Court of Appeals for the Ninth Circuit denied Trump's immediate petition to stay the temporary restraining order from the Federal District Court in Washington State. On February 9, two days after hearing argument, a panel of the United States Court of Appeals for the Ninth Circuit unanimously denied the request for a stay of Judge Robart's temporary restraining order. On February 16, the Trump administration stated in a court filing before the Ninth Circuit that they expected to replace the executive order with a new one the following week; the court responded by staying the en-banc review of its previous ruling.

Judge Alex Kozinski of the 9th Circuit Court of Appeals filed a late dissent on March 17, 2017 to the 9th Cir. opinion in Washington v. Trump arguing against the State of Washington's Establishment Clause claims on grounds that Trump's speech during the campaign was political speech protected by the First Amendment. (Even though the 9th Circuit had declined to address that issue in reaching its ruling on Washington v. Trump and U.S. courts do not typically rule on issues that are not before them, Kozinski argued it was acceptable for him to address the issue because the district judge in Hawaii had cited the 9th Circuit opinion in reaching its Establishment Clause ruling.)

On February 13 Judge Leonie Brinkema of the Eastern District of Virginia ordered a preliminary injunction against the federal defendants in Aziz v. Trump because the executive order was likely discriminatory against Muslims. Her ruling was the first among cases challenging the executive order to find that plaintiffs were likely to succeed on grounds that the executive order violated the Establishment Clause of the U.S. Constitution.

On August 13 the plaintiffs, The State of Hawaii and the Muslim Association of Hawaii, dropped the lawsuit, effectively ending the litigation.

== Revocation and replacement ==
In February 2017, Politico reported Trump "suggest[ing] that the White House is trying to redraft the order to strengthen it against legal challenges." The federal government also said in court filings that a new executive order is planned to be issued to address constitutional concerns about EO 13769. A White House official later quoted by CNN suggested the new order was being delayed, in part by the administration's expectations about the executive order's perception relative to other events in the news cycle. (Trump initially claimed the replacement order would be issued the week of February 19. On February 22 the Trump administration said the replacement order would be delayed until the following week. That week, the White House expected the order to be issued Wednesday, March 1.) According to the White House, the order has been "finalized" since at least February 22, although at that time agencies were still working out how to implement it.

According to an administration official, a redraft version of the executive order will focus on the same seven countries minus Iraq, but exempt lawful permanent residents and those who already hold visas, whether or not they have entered the United States. The new executive order would reportedly also drop the indefinite suspension of Syrian refugee immigration and reduce it to the 120-day suspension specified for other countries in the order.

A redrafted executive order was issued March 6, 2017. The redraft drops Iraq from some of the provisions regarding the seven countries specified by executive order 13769. Tillerson, McMaster, and Mattis had advocated for the exclusion of Iraq. The redraft executive order removes the exemption for religious minorities in the banned countries that was present in the first order. The redrafted order does not apply to green-card holders or anyone with a valid visa who is inside the U.S. The redrafted order includes case-by-case waiver process that was not available to refugees from the countries affected by the first order.

On March 15, 2017, United States district judge Derrick Watson of the United States District Court for the District of Hawaii issued a temporary restraining order preventing Executive Order 13780 from going into effect, on the grounds that the State of Hawaii showed a strong likelihood of success on their Establishment Clause claim in asserting that Executive Order 13780 was in fact a "Muslim ban". Judge Watson stated in his ruling, "When considered alongside the constitutional injuries and harms discussed above, and the questionable evidence supporting the Government's national security motivations, the balance of equities and public interests justify granting the Plaintiffs. Nationwide relief is appropriate in light of the likelihood of success on the Establishment Clause claim." The ruling was denounced by President Donald Trump as being "an unprecedented judicial overreach", and stated that the ruling would be appealed, and that "This ruling makes us look weak."

In a per curiam decision, on June 26, 2017, the Supreme Court reinstated key provisions of the order. The court also granted certiorari and set oral arguments for the fall term.

== See also ==
- Trump v. Hawaii
- 2017 electronics ban
- Muslim immigration ban
- Day Without Immigrants 2017
- Final Report of the Task Force on Combating Terrorist and Foreign Fighter Travel
- Ideological restrictions on naturalization in U.S. law
- Immigration reduction in the United States
- List of executive actions by Donald Trump
- List of citizenships refused entry to foreign states
- National Security Entry-Exit Registration System
- Patriot Act
- Protests against Donald Trump
- Refugees of the Syrian Civil War
- United States Citizenship and Immigration Services
- Visa policy of the United States
- National Vetting Center
