= 2017 electronics ban =

Order issued by the United States government in March 2017

The 2017 electronics ban was an order issued by the United States government in March 2017 banning electronics beyond the size of a mobile phone on carry-on luggage for direct flights departing from 10 major airports in the Middle East and traveling to the United States, and requiring airlines to enforce this ban. The order was issued based on intelligence that the Al-Qaeda in the Arabian Peninsula was planning on using batteries and compartments of large electronic equipment to conceal explosives that are not detectable by current aviation security scanners. The US government has been accused by the International Air Transport Association of implementing the ban more of as a protectionist measure to shield major US airlines from increasing competition of major airlines from the Middle East than for security reasons. The United Kingdom has issued a similar ban but covers a different range of airports and airlines, including low-cost airlines. US officials lifted the ban in July 2017, citing improved airport security.

== Background ==
According to an anonymous official quoted by The New York Times, Israeli hackers gathered intelligence from bombmakers in Syria. From this intelligence, the United States government believed that terrorists were trying to make explosives which resembled laptop batteries.

On 20 March 2017, Royal Jordanian tweeted that it was banning all electronics from being brought into the cabin. This tweet was later deleted. The next day, news surfaced that this action was part of a wider order by US officials implementing an electronics ban on airports and airlines flying out of Middle Eastern airports. Passengers were required to check in all electronic equipment bigger than a mobile phone. Flights that do not fly directly to the United States were not affected by the ban. US intelligence officials justified the order in reference to the risk that the Al-Qaeda in the Arabian Peninsula was developing explosives that would bypass scanners and metal detectors. Airlines were given until 24 March to implement the ban.

== Controversy ==
The ban has been controversial for two reasons. Firstly, the selective nature of the electronics ban has led to accusations by the International Air Transport Association and media commentators from the Sydney Morning Herald, Vanity Fair, Bloomberg and Straits Times that this was more of a veiled attempt to protectionist measure to shield major US airlines from increasing competition of major airlines from the Middle East than for security reasons. The ban especially affected business travelers, who are unable to work during the flight and may be required by their companies to hold onto their equipment which otherwise may be at risk of getting stolen, damage, or hacked if they were to be checked in. Many of these travelers would rather travel through an airline not affected by the ban.

Secondly, there was a risk that putting electronics containing lithium batteries together in the cargo hold significantly increases the risk of fire, posing a safety risk to its passengers. Earlier, some airlines have banned batteries from being checked into the cargo hold after UPS Airlines Flight 6 crashed due to an uncontained fire caused by lithium batteries.

Screening security at American airports has also been questioned, with suggestions that some American airports should also force passengers to put laptops and other electronics in the airplane hold until security at these airports improves.

== Reaction ==
=== Airlines ===
- Heads of airlines affected by the ban criticized the selective nature of the ban.
  - Qatar Airways CEO Akbar Al Baker suggested that "instead of going from the airports where there is a ban, (terrorists) will go to airports where there is no ban".
  - Emirates President Tim Clark said that "(to) suggest that Dubai doesn't have the equal capabilities or better than the Europeans, the Americans and the Asians in terms of search, interdiction and surveillance, I find amazing", and the ban would be "hugely disruptive".
- Affected airlines began taking measures to try and mitigate effects of the ban:
  - Emirates, Qatar Airways and Turkish Airlines allowed passengers to use their large electronic equipment at the gate, up to the moment of boarding.
  - Etihad Airways and Qatar Airways offered free Wi-Fi to all business and first class passengers traveling to the US. Turkish Airlines offered free Wi-Fi for all passengers traveling to the US or UK.
  - Emirates, Etihad Airways, and Qatar Airways also offered complementary loan of Microsoft Surface tablets, Apple iPads and laptops respectively to all business and first class passengers traveling to the US.
- Air India, an airline not affected by the ban but which also flies to the United States, reported seeing bookings double after the electronics ban was implemented.
- On 20 April 2017, Emirates announced that as a result of "a significant deterioration in the booking profiles on all our U.S. routes" from this ban, Executive Order 13769 and Executive Order 13780, it was reducing the capacity and number of flights to the US.

=== Other states ===
- The United Kingdom government also implemented an electronic bans for flights to the United Kingdom, but covered a different range of airports and airlines. The ME3 carriers were not on the UK electronics ban.
- The governments of France and Canada are considering whether to implement a similar ban.
- The Australian government has decided against implementing an electronics ban, but chose to increase security screening for Middle Eastern flights to Australia.

=== Other non-state parties ===
- The Director General of the International Air Transport Association Alexandre de Juniac has said that the "current measures are not acceptable as a long-term solution" and "the commercial distortions they create are severe", calling for governments to find an alternative to the electronics ban.

== Airports subject to the US electronics ban ==
The electronics ban originally applied to ten airports served by eight Middle Eastern airlines and one Turkish airline. On 2 July 2017, the ban was lifted from Etihad Airways flights from Abu Dhabi International Airport to the US. Turkish Airlines, Qatar Airways, Emirates, Royal Jordanian, Egyptair, Kuwait Airways, Royal Air Maroc, and Saudia soon followed suit and the bans were lifted on them. No airports are currently subject to the US electronics ban.

== Gradual lifting of the ban ==
Beginning July 2017, the United States introduced new security guidelines that was extended to all 105 countries. In addition, the United States also began to lift the existing ban on Middle Eastern airlines which it found was compliant with the new security guidelines.

- On 2 July 2017, the USDHS exempted Etihad Airways from the ban after they updated their passenger screenings.
- On 5 July 2017, the laptop ban was lifted on US-bound flights from Dubai (Emirates) and Istanbul (Turkish Airlines) after their implementation of new security measures.
- On 6 July 2017, the electronics ban on US-bound flights from Doha (Qatar Airways) was lifted as new security measures were implemented.
- On 20 July 2017, the electronics ban was completely lifted.

== See also ==
- Executive Order 13769
- Airline security
