= U.S. government response to the September 11 attacks =

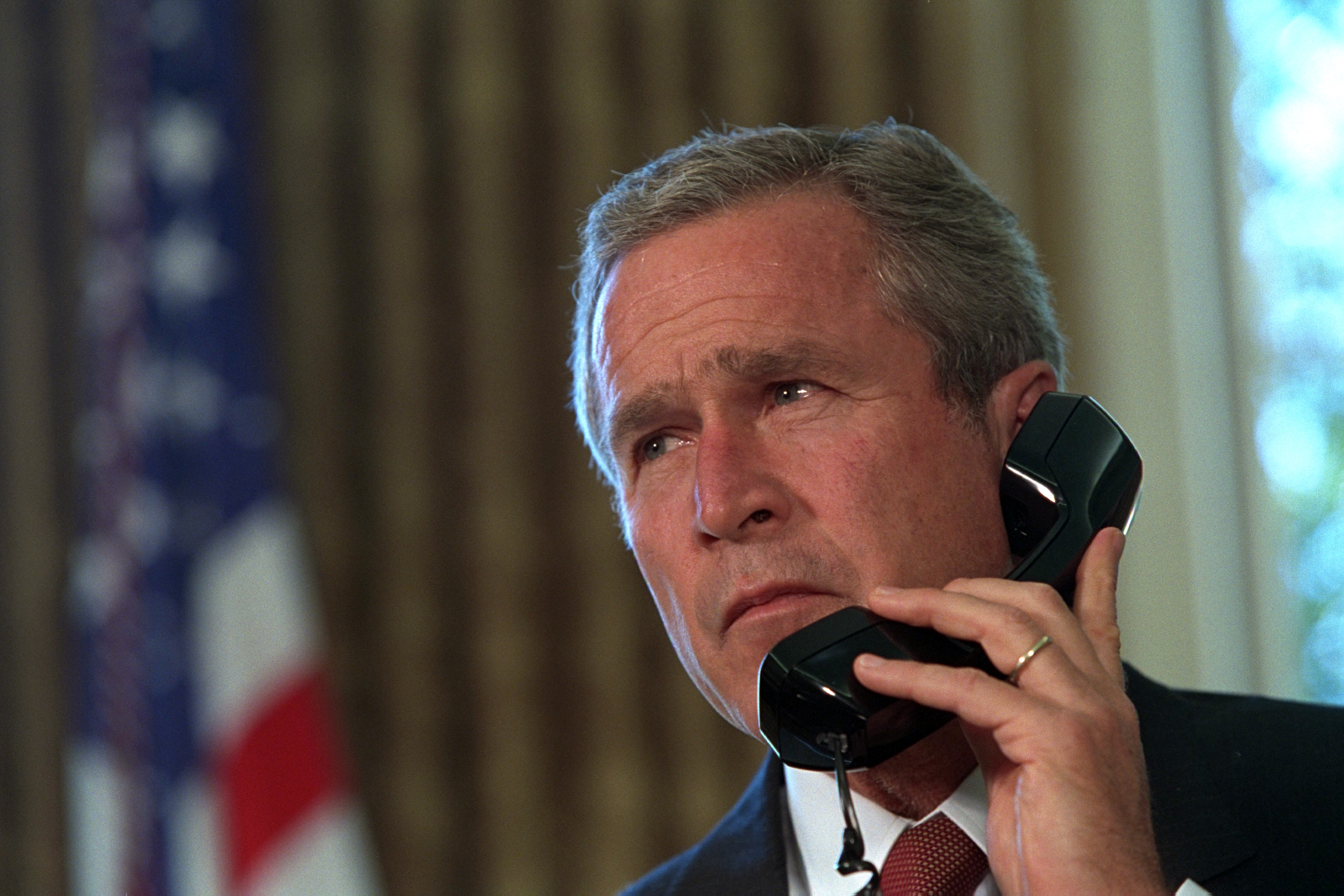
U.S. president George W. Bush speaking with the governor of New York George Pataki and the mayor of New York City Rudy Giuliani two days following the September 11 attacks, on September 13, 2001

After the September 11 attacks in 2001, the United States government responded by commencing immediate rescue operations at the World Trade Center site, grounding civilian aircraft, and beginning a long-term response that included official investigations, legislative changes, military action, and restoration projects.

Immediately following the attacks, massive search and rescue operations were launched, and terrorism investigations led to the declaration of war on terrorism that launched military engagements in Afghanistan and Iraq. The 9/11 Commission inspected the causes and motives of the attacks, and released its findings in the 9/11 Commission Report.

As a result of the attacks, the U.S. federal government enacted the Homeland Security Act of 2002, creating the Department of Homeland Security, and the USA PATRIOT Act, to help detect and prosecute terrorism and other crimes. Subsequent clean-up and restoration efforts led to the rebuilding of Lower Manhattan, and federal grants helped support the development of the National September 11 Memorial & Museum, both of which opened in the early 2010s.

== Investigations ==
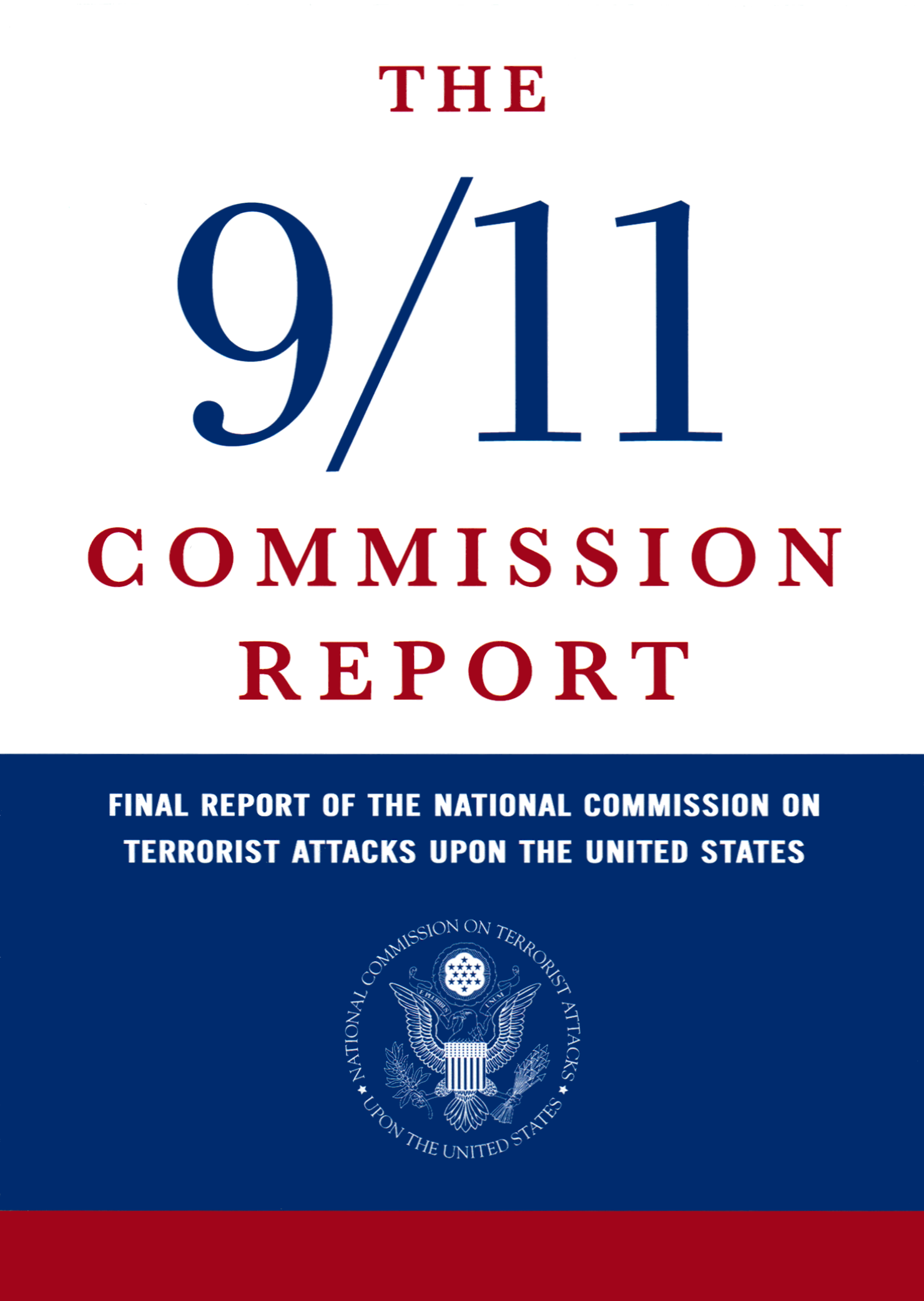
The 9/11 Commission Report, prepared by the 9/11 Commission, was released on July 22, 2004.

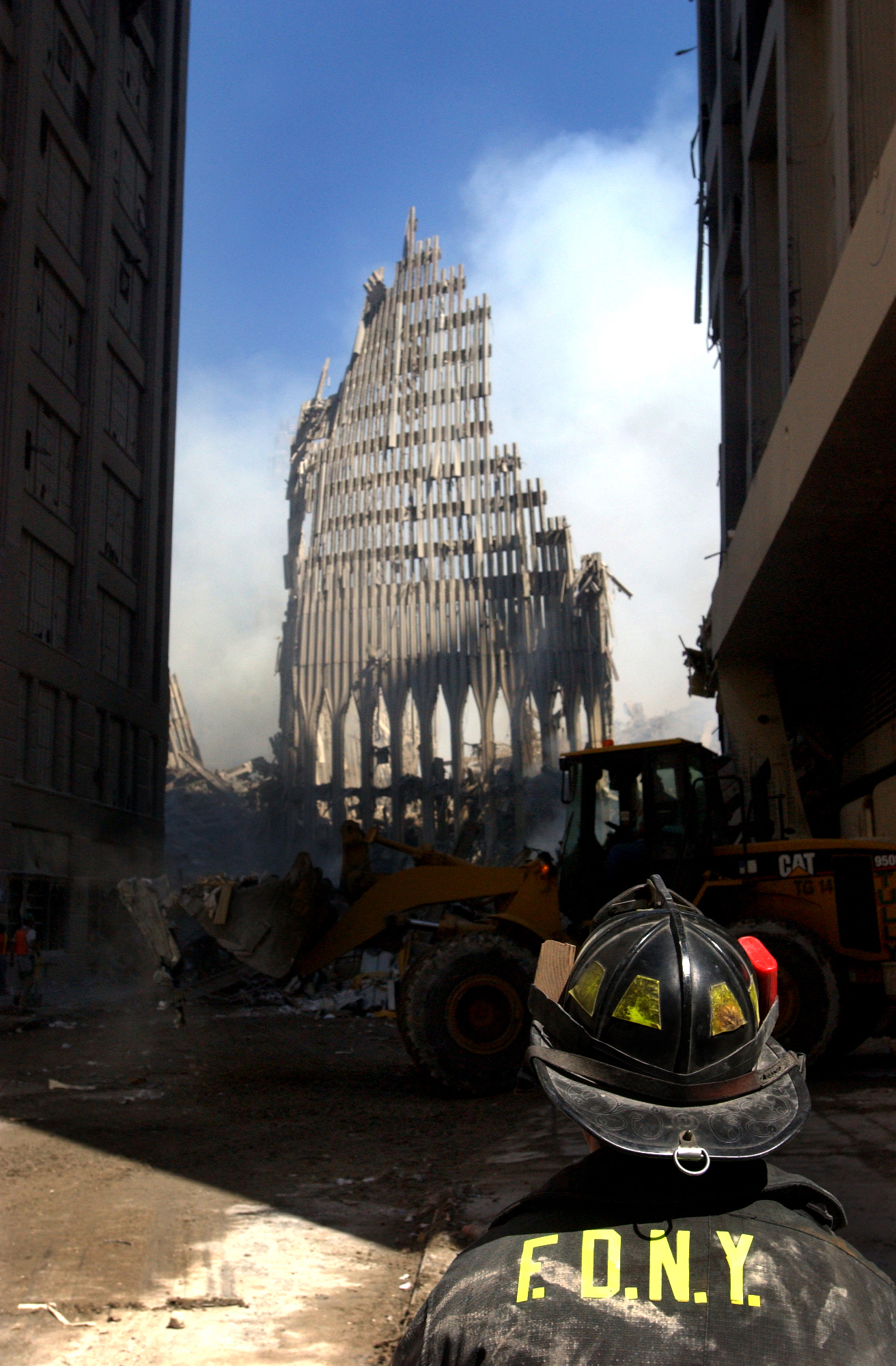
A New York City Fire Department firefighter looks up at the remains of the South Tower on September 13, 2001, two days following the attacks.

An illustration of the September 11 attacks on the World Trade Center with a vertical view of the impact locations. The collapse of the Twin Towers has been the subject of extensive expert study, analysis, and commentary.

=== 9/11 Commission Report ===
The National Commission on Terrorist Attacks Upon the United States, known as the 9/11 Commission and chaired by former New Jersey governor Thomas Kean, was formed in late 2002 to prepare a full and complete account of the circumstances surrounding the attacks, including preparedness for, and the immediate response to, the September 11 attacks. On July 22, 2004, the commission released its findings in the 9/11 Commission Report.

=== Internal CIA review ===
The Central Intelligence Agency Office of Inspector General conducted an internal review of the Central Intelligence Agency's performance prior to the September 11 attacks and was harshly critical of senior CIA officials for not doing everything possible to confront terrorism, including failing to stop two of the 9/11 hijackers, Nawaf al-Hazmi and Khalid al-Mihdhar, as they entered the United States, and hit failure to share information on the two men with the FBI.

=== World Trade Center collapse ===
A federal technical building and fire safety investigation of the collapses of the Twin Towers was conducted by the United States Department of Commerce's National Institute of Standards and Technology (NIST). The goals of this investigation were to investigate the building construction, the materials used, and the technical conditions that contributed to the outcome of the WTC disaster. The investigation was to serve as the basis for:

- Improvements in the way buildings are designed, constructed, maintained, and used
- Improved tools and guidance for industry and safety officials
- Revisions to building and fire codes, standards, and practices
- Improved public safety

The report was completed on April 6, 2005, concluding that the fireproofing on the Twin Towers' steel infrastructures was blown off by the initial impact of the planes and that, if this had not occurred, the towers would likely have remained standing. The fires weakened the trusses supporting the floors, making them sag. The sagging floors pulled on the exterior steel columns to the point where exterior columns bowed inward. With the damage to the core columns, the buckling exterior columns could no longer support the buildings, causing them to collapse. In addition, the report asserts that the towers' stairwells were not adequately reinforced to provide emergency escape for people above the impact zones. NIST stated that the final report on the collapse of 7 WTC will appear in a separate report.

== Civilian aircraft grounding ==
For the first time in history, all nonemergency civilian aircraft in the United States and several other countries including Canada were immediately grounded, stranding tens of thousands of passengers across the world. The order was given at 9:42 by Federal Aviation Administration Command Center national operations manager Ben Sliney. According to the 9/11 Commission Report, "This was an unprecedented order. The air traffic control system handled it with great skill, as about 4,500 commercial and general aviation aircraft soon landed without incident.

== Invocation of the continuity of government ==
Contingency plans for the continuity of government and the evacuation of leaders were implemented almost immediately after the attacks. Congress, however, was not told that the US was under a continuity of government status until February 2002.

== Rescue, recovery, and compensation ==
Within hours of the attacks on New York City, a massive search and rescue (SAR) operation was launched, which included over 350 search and rescue dogs. Initially, only a handful of wounded people were found at the site, and in the weeks that followed it became evident that there were no survivors to be found. Only twenty survivors were found alive in the rubble.

Rescue and recovery efforts took months to complete. It took several weeks to put out the fires burning in the rubble of the buildings, with the clean-up not being completed until May 2002. Temporary wooden "viewing platforms" were set up for tourists to view construction crews clearing out the gaping holes where the towers once stood. All of these platforms were closed on May 30, 2002.

Many relief funds were set up to assist victims of the attacks, with the task of providing financial assistance to the survivors and families of victims. By the deadline for victim's compensation of September 11, 2003, 2,833 applications had been received from the families of those killed.

== War on terror ==
In the aftermath of the terrorist attacks, many U.S. citizens believed that the attacks had "changed the world forever." The Bush administration announced a war on terror, with the goal of bringing Osama bin Laden and al-Qaeda to justice and preventing the emergence of other terrorist networks. These goals would be accomplished by means including economic and military sanctions against states perceived as harboring terrorists and increasing global surveillance and intelligence sharing. Immediately after the September 11 attacks, U.S. officials speculated on possible involvement by Saddam Hussein, which later was proven to be false.

As the attacks on the United States were judged to be within the parameters of its charter, NATO declared that Article 5 of the NATO agreement was satisfied on September 12, 2001, making the US war on terrorism the first time since its inception that NATO would actually participate in a "hot" war.

Osama bin Laden himself was located by US intelligence in 2011, and was killed in Abbottabad, Pakistan by a US special operations unit on May 2, 2011.

In 2014, President Barack Obama claimed the formal end of the war in Afghanistan. However, U.S. troops did not withdraw entirely, as fewer than 15,000 troops still remained in the country.

From 2019 to August 30, 2021, presidents Donald Trump and Joe Biden withdrew the remaining 14,000 U.S. troops from Afghanistan, marking the official end of the 2001-2021 war.

Ayman al-Zawahiri, another planner of the attacks who succeeded Bin Laden as leader of Al-Qaeda, was killed by a U.S. drone strike in Kabul, Afghanistan, on July 31, 2022.

== Arrests ==
Following the attacks, 762 suspects were taken into custody in the United States. On December 12, 2001, Fox News reported that some 60 Israelis were among them. Federal investigators were reported to have described them as part of a long-running effort to spy on American government officials. A "handful" of these Israelis were described as active Israeli military or intelligence operatives.

In a letter to the editor, Ira Glaser, former head of the ACLU, claimed that none of those 762 detainees were charged with terrorism. "The Justice Department inspector general's report implies more than the violation of the civil liberties of 762 non-citizens. It also implies a dysfunctional and ineffective approach to protecting the public after Sept. 11, 2001.... No one can be made safer by arresting the wrong people".

== Domestic response ==
Immediately after opening the hunt on Osama bin Laden, President Bush also visited the Islamic Center of Washington and asked the public to view Arabs and Muslims living in the United States as American patriots. However, Islamophobia, or the fear of, hatred of, or prejudice against the religion of Islam or Muslims in general, still rose. Incidents of harassment and hate crimes against Muslims, Arabs, Middle Easterners, and South Asians was reported rose by a factor of more than 16 in the days following the attacks.

Congress passed and President Bush signed the Homeland Security Act of 2002, creating the Department of Homeland Security, representing the largest restructuring of the U.S. government in contemporary history. Congress passed the USA PATRIOT Act, stating that it would help detect and prosecute terrorism and other crimes. Civil liberties groups have criticized the PATRIOT Act, saying that it allows law enforcement to invade the privacy of citizens and eliminates judicial oversight of law-enforcement and domestic intelligence gathering. The Bush Administration also invoked 9/11 as the reason to have the National Security Agency initiate a secret operation, "to eavesdrop on telephone and e-mail communications between the United States and people overseas without court approval."

=== National Security Entry-Exit Registration System (NSEERS) ===
On June 6, 2002, Attorney General Ashcroft proposed regulations that would create a special registration program that required males aged 16 to 64 who were citizens of designated foreign nations resident in the U.S. to register with the Immigration and Naturalization Service (INS), have their identity verified, and be interviewed, photographed and fingerprinted. Called the National Security Entry-Exit Registration System (NSEERS), it comprised two programs, the tracking of arrivals and departures on the one hand, and voluntary registrations of those already in the U.S., known as the "call-in" program. The DOJ acted under the authority of the Immigration and Nationality Act of 1952, which had authorized a registration system but was allowed to lapse in the 1980s because of budget concerns. Ashcroft identified those required to register as "individuals of elevated national security concern who stay in the country for more than 30 days."

The processing of arrivals as part of their customs screening began in October 2002. It first focused on arrivals from Iran, Iraq, Libya, Sudan, and Syria. It handled 127,694 people before being phased out as universal screening processes were put in place.

The "call-in" registrations began in December. It initially applied to nationals of five countries, Iran, Iraq, Syria, Libya, and Sudan, who were required to register by December 16, 2002. On November 6, the United States Department of Justice (DOJ) set a deadline of January 10 for those from another 13 countries: Afghanistan, Algeria, Bahrain, Eritrea, Lebanon, Morocco, North Korea, Oman, Qatar, Somalia, Tunisia, the United Arab Emirates, and Yemen. On December 16, it set a deadline of February 21 for those from Armenia, Pakistan, and Saudi Arabia. It later included those from Egypt, Jordan, Kuwait, Indonesia, and Bangladesh. It eventually included citizens of 23 nations with majority Muslim populations, as well as Eritrea, which has a large Muslim population, and North Korea. Failure to register at an INS office resulted in deportation. Those found in violation of their visa were allowed to post bail while processed for deportation. The program registered 82,880 people, of whom 13,434 were found in violation of their visas. Because nationality and Muslim affiliation are only approximations of one another, the program extended to such non-Muslims as Iranian Jews. The program was phased out beginning in May 2003.

The program received a mixed response. Some government officials pronounced the program a success. They said in the course of the combined programs, registration upon entry, and that of residents, they had arrested 11 suspected terrorists, found more than 800 criminal suspects or deportable convicts, and identified more than 9,000 illegal aliens. DOJ general counsel Kris Kobach said: "I regard this as a great success. Sept. 11th awakened the country to the fact that weak immigration enforcement presents a huge vulnerability that terrorists can exploit." DOJ officials said fewer than 5% of those who came into INS offices to register were detained. James W. Ziglar, former head of INS who left the agency early in 2002, in part because of his differing opinions about the program with Ashcroft, said his objections to it had been proven correct: "The people who could be identified as terrorists weren't going to show up. This project was a huge exercise and caused us to use resources in the field that could have been much better deployed." "As expected, we got nothing out of it." Although Homeland Security officials said that six men allegedly linked to terrorism were arrested as a result of the call-in program, that contention was challenged by the Sept. 11 commission, which found little evidence to support that claim.

In 2011, DHS suspended the program on efficiency grounds, stating that all NSEERS information was now collected from other sources. It completely glossed over the program's civil liberties costs and did not communicate with those harmed by the program, according to the ACLU. NSEERS was finally officially terminated in 2016 by the Obama administration in order to make it more difficult for President-elect Donald Trump to achieve his goal of introducing a Muslim registry.

== See also ==
- Bush Doctrine
- Guantanamo Bay
- Project Strike Back
- War in Afghanistan (2001–2021)
