= Executive Order 13780 =

2017 executive order by U.S. President Trump

- Protecting the Nation from Foreign Terrorist Entry into the United States

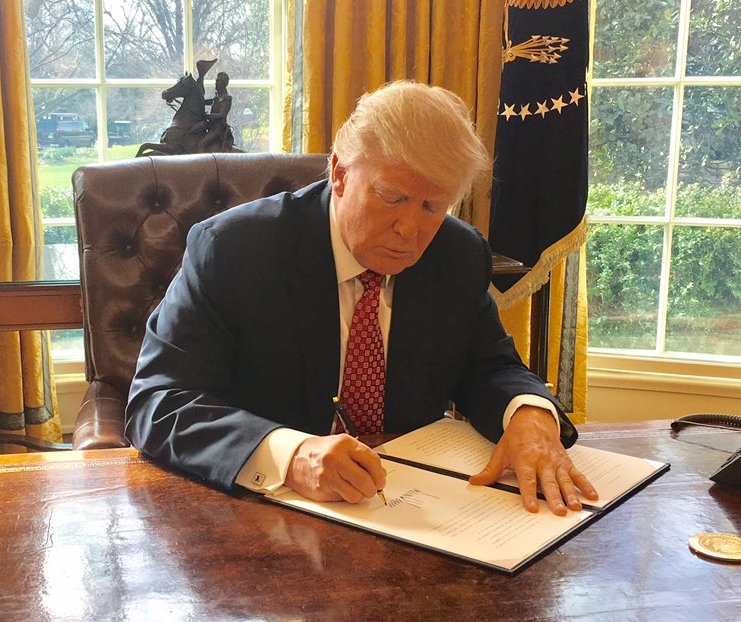
- President Trump signing the revised order in the Oval Office
- Executive Order 13780 in the Federal Register
- Type: Executive order
- Number: 13780
- President: Donald Trump
- Signed: March 6, 2017

Federal Register details
- Federal Register document number: 2017-04837
- Publication date: March 9, 2017
- Document citation: 82 FR 13209

Summary
- Revokes and replaces Executive Order 13769; Suspends the U.S. Refugee Admissions Program; Restricts admission and halts new visa applications from nationals of certain countries; Other provisions; Related proclamations in 2017, 2018 and 2020; Revoked on January 20, 2021

Repealed by
- Ending Discriminatory Bans on Entry to The United States, January 20, 2021

Executive Order 13780, titled Protecting the Nation from Foreign Terrorist Entry into the United States, was an executive order signed by United States President Donald Trump on March 6, 2017. It placed a 90-day restriction on entry to the U.S. by nationals of Iran, Libya, Somalia, Sudan, Syria and Yemen, and barred entry for all refugees who did not possess either a visa or valid travel documents for 120 days. This executive order—sometimes called "Travel Ban 2.0"—revoked and replaced Executive Order 13769 issued on January 27, 2017.

The order was challenged in court by several states. On March 15, 2017, Judge Derrick Watson of the District Court for the District of Hawaii issued a temporary restraining order enjoining the government from enforcing several key provisions of the order (Sections 2 and 6). The judge determined the executive order was likely motivated by anti-Muslim sentiment and thus breached the Establishment Clause of the United States Constitution. On the same date, Judge Theodore Chuang of the District Court for the District of Maryland reached a similar conclusion (enjoining Section 2(c) only). On May 25, 2017, the Court of Appeals for the Fourth Circuit refused to reinstate the ban on constitutional grounds, citing religious discrimination. On June 26, 2017, the Supreme Court agreed to hear oral arguments for the petition to vacate the injunctions, meanwhile allowing the government to move forward with a narrowed portion of the ban. The Court eventually dismissed the challenges for losing practical relevance after the 90-day travel ban expired. On September 24, 2017, President Trump signed Presidential Proclamation 9645, replacing the expired ban. The new proclamation banned entry for many nationals of Iran, Libya, Somalia, Syria, Yemen, Chad, Venezuela, and North Korea. The district court and court of appeals again enjoined the new proclamation. On December 4, the Supreme Court allowed the ban to go into full effect, pending legal challenges. On June 26, 2018, the Supreme Court upheld the president's authority to implement these restrictions in the case of Trump v. Hawaii. On February 21, 2020, Presidential Proclamation 9983 reaffirmed the ban and additionally banned certain visa entries for citizens of Eritrea, Kyrgyzstan, Myanmar, Nigeria, Sudan, and Tanzania who were outside of the U.S., seeking to travel to the U.S., and did not already have a valid visa.

On January 20, 2021, President Joe Biden revoked Executive Order 13780 and its related proclamations in Presidential Proclamation 10141.

== Provisions and effect ==
At 12:01 am EDT on March 16, 2017, Executive Order 13780 revoked and replaced Executive Order 13769. Trump called the new order a "watered down, politically correct version" of the prior executive order.

Sections 2 and 6 were enjoined by Judge Watson's temporary restraining order in Hawaii v. Trump before they could take effect. Executive Order 13780 contained similar provisions as Executive Order 13769 but removed Iraq from the list of banned countries and removed the indefinite ban on Syrian refugees. Section 2 suspended the U.S. Refugee Admissions Program (USRAP) for 120 days, and Section 6 reduced the number of refugees to be admitted into the United States (in 2017) from 110,000 to 50,000. Sections 2 and 6 were enjoined by Judge Watson's temporary restraining order in Hawaii v. Trump before they could take effect.

Implementing the directive of Executive Order 13780, the United States Department of State proposed a new form, DS-5535, to collect additional information from all visa applicants "who have been determined to warrant additional scrutiny in connection with terrorism or other national security-related visa ineligibilities". The form contained new protocols and procedures for the purpose of "[ensuring] the proper collection of all information necessary to rigorously evaluate all grounds of inadmissibility or deportability, or grounds for the denial of other immigration benefits". The public was given fourteen days to comment on the proposed form. 55 academic and scientific organizations cosigned a letter, stating that while they appreciate and support the nation's security needs, the proposed form "is likely to have a chilling effect" on all travelers to the United States due to uncertainties and confusion regarding the supplemental questions and by delaying processing travelers who have strict deadlines and enrollment dates. The organizations said the form was unclear in the criteria for determining who would complete the form, the impact of unintentional incomplete disclosure of information, methods to correcting information initially provided, and how and for how long the information would be stored and kept private.

=== Section 3: Scope and implementation of the suspension ===
Section 3 outlined many exceptions to suspensions of immigration that the order required.

==== Exceptions ====
The order did not apply to international travelers from the named countries in some circumstances.

Citation	Individual Exceptions listed in Executive Order 13780
3(a)(i)	Any foreign national who is inside the United States on the effective date of this order.
3(a)(ii)	Any foreign national who had a valid visa at 5:00 p.m., eastern standard time on January 27, 2017.
3(a)(iii)	Any foreign national who had a valid visa on the effective date of this order.
3(b)(i)	Any lawful permanent resident of the United States.
3(b)(ii)	Any foreign national who is admitted to or paroled into the United States on or after the effective date of this order.
3(b)(iii)	Any foreign national who has a document other than a visa, valid on the effective date of this order or issued on any date thereafter, that permits him or her to travel to the United States and seek entry or admission, such as an advance parole document.
3(b)(iv)	Any dual national of a country designated under section 2 of this order when the individual is traveling on a passport issued by a non-designated country.
3(b)(v)	Any foreign national traveling on a diplomatic or diplomatic-type visa, North Atlantic Treaty Organization visa, C-2 visa for travel to the United Nations, or G-1, G-2, G-3, or G-4 visa.
3(b)(vi)	Any foreign national who has been granted asylum.
3(b)(vi)	Any refugee who has already been admitted to the United States.
3(b)(vi)	Any individual who has been granted withholding of removal, advance parole, or protection under the Convention Against Torture.

==== Case-by-case determinations ====
The order also allowed exceptions to the entry ban to be reviewed on a case-by-case basis for the DHS and the Department of State to issue waivers or approval of a visa for travelers from the countries of concern stated in the order.

Citation	Case-by-Case Exceptions listed in Executive Order 13780
3(c)(i)	The foreign national has previously been admitted to the United States for a continuous period of work, study, or other long-term activity, is outside the United States on the effective date of this order, seeks to reenter the United States to resume that activity, and the denial of reentry during the suspension period would impair that activity.
3(c)(ii)	The foreign national has previously established significant contacts with the United States but is outside the United States on the effective date of this order for work, study, or other lawful activity.
3(c)(iii)	The foreign national seeks to enter the United States for significant business or professional obligations and the denial of entry during the suspension period would impair those obligations.
3(c)(iv)	The foreign national seeks to enter the United States to visit or reside with a close family member (e.g., a spouse, child, or parent) who is a United States citizen, lawful permanent resident, or alien lawfully admitted on a valid nonimmigrant visa, and the denial of entry during the suspension period would cause undue hardship.
3(c)(v)	The foreign national is an infant, a young child or adoptee, an individual needing urgent medical care, or someone whose entry is otherwise justified by the special circumstances of the case.
3(c)(vi)	The foreign national has been employed by, or on behalf of, the United States Government (or is an eligible dependent of such an employee) and the employee can document that he or she has provided faithful and valuable service to the United States Government.
3(c)(vii)	The foreign national is traveling for purposes related to an international organization designated under the International Organizations Immunities Act (IOIA), 22 U.S.C. § 288, traveling for purposes of conducting meetings or business with the United States Government, or traveling to conduct business on behalf of an international organization not designated under the IOIA.
3(c)(viii)	The foreign national is a landed immigrant of Canada who applies for a visa at a location within Canada.
3(c)(ix)	The foreign national is traveling as a United States Government-sponsored exchange visitor.

=== Section 6: Realignment of the U.S. Refugee Admissions Program for Fiscal Year 2017 ===
Under Section 6(a) of Executive Order 13780, refugees were prohibited from entering the United States under the USRAP for 120 days. During the 120-day period, the Secretary of State, in conjunction with the Secretary of Homeland Security and in consultation with the Director of National Intelligence, was tasked with implementing additional security procedures for the USRAP application and adjudication processes. The Secretary of State would resume making decisions on applications for refugee status only for stateless people and nationals of countries for which security measures were deemed adequate. The suspension did not apply to refugee applicants who had been formally scheduled for transit prior to the effective date of the order. Section 6(b) lowered the cap for refugee admissions for fiscal year 2017 from 110,000 to 50,000. Section 6(c) granted the Secretary of State and the Secretary of Homeland Security the discretion to admit individuals as refugees on a case-by-case basis, such as in cases when a preexisting international agreement or arrangement existed.

=== Section 8: Expedited completion of the biometric entry–exit tracking system ===
Under Section 8 of Executive Order 13780, the head of DHS was mandated to "expedite the completion and implementation of a biometric entry–exit tracking system for in-scope travelers to the United States, as recommended by the National Commission on Terrorist Attacks Upon the United States." Gary Leff, an airline-industry expert, referring to a 2016 DHS publication, believed it was likely the term "in-scope" referred to all non-U.S. citizens within the ages of 14 and 79, which Leff believed would increase the costs (money and time) of air travel perhaps due to fingerprinting requirements for all such people who traveled into the U.S.

== Statutory authorization and related statutory prohibitions ==
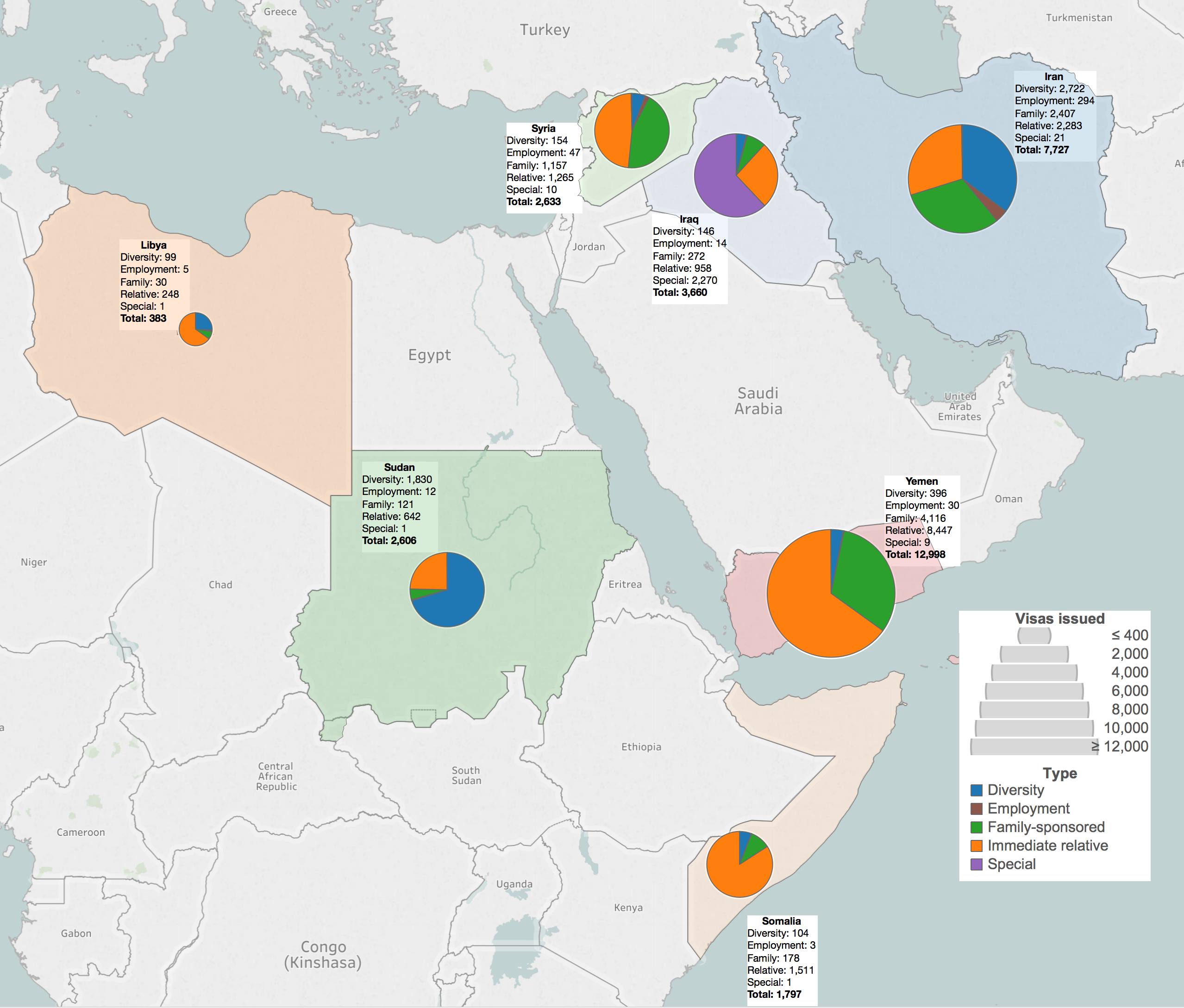
Visas issued in 2016 for the seven countries affected by Executive Order 13769. Total is shown by size, and color breaks down type of visa.

The order cited paragraph (f) of Title 8 of the United States Code § 1182, which discusses inadmissible aliens. Paragraph (f) states:

Whenever the President finds that the entry of any aliens or of any class of aliens into the United States would be detrimental to the interests of the United States, he may by proclamation, and for such period as he shall deem necessary, suspend the entry of all aliens or any class of aliens as immigrants or nonimmigrants, or impose on the entry of aliens any restrictions he may deem to be appropriate.

When Judge Chuang enjoined part of the executive order, he based his decision in part on paragraph (a) of Title 8 of the United States Code § 1152, which discusses impermissible discrimination when granting immigrant visas:

No person shall receive any preference or priority or be discriminated against in the issuance of an immigrant visa because of the person's race, sex, nationality, place of birth, or place of residence.

== Countries included in the executive order and related presidential proclamations ==
As originally written, Executive Order 13780 banned nationals of Iran, Libya, Somalia, Sudan, Syria and Yemen from entering the United States, with certain exceptions, for 90 days. This order did not include Iraq, which had been listed in Executive Order 13769. The Trump administration listed these countries citing their governments' support for terrorism or their inability to combat it, as well as potential unreliability of identity documents.

Due to court injunctions, the executive order was suspended until June 26, 2017, when it was allowed to take effect by the Supreme Court but was limited to people who did not have a "bona fide relationship with a person or entity in the United States".

=== Presidential Proclamation 9645 ===
At the end of the initial period of 90 days, on September 24, 2017, President Donald Trump signed Presidential Proclamation 9645, extending the ban permanently, modifying the list of countries and specifying affected immigration categories of their nationals. The ban applied to all nationals of North Korea and Syria; nationals of Iran except on student or exchange visitor visas; nationals of Chad, Libya and Yemen as immigrants or on tourist or business visas; nationals of Somalia as immigrants; and to certain government officials of Venezuela and their immediate family members, but not to its nationals in general, on tourist or business visas. According to the proclamation, these countries were listed due to their failure to adequately share information related to public safety and terrorism about their nationals, among other reasons. Sudan was removed from the list.

The State of Hawaii amended its pre-existing lawsuit in federal court to stop Presidential Proclamation 9645 from taking effect. On October 17, 2017, a federal judge determined that Presidential Proclamation 9645 "lacks sufficient findings that the entry of more than 150 million nationals from [the] six specified countries would be 'detrimental to the interests of the United States'". The federal judge granted a temporary restraining order, preventing Presidential Proclamation 9645 from taking effect on all countries mentioned, except for North Korea and Venezuela, the next day.

The International Refugee Assistance Project and other organizations, represented by the American Civil Liberties Union and the National Immigration Law Center, also filed a lawsuit to prevent Presidential Proclamation 9645 from taking effect. On October 18, 2017, a federal judge ruled that President Trump's public comments strongly indicated that national security was not the primary goal of the travel ban. Determining that President Trump may have intended to violate the constitutional prohibition on religious preferences when issuing Presidential Proclamation 9645, the federal judge ruled that the federal government could not enforce the travel ban on people from the countries listed, except for North Korea and Venezuela, who had a bona fide relationship to a person or entity in the United States.

Enforcement of the orders, barring the enforcement of the proclamation in part, from the Court of Appeals for the Fourth and Ninth Circuit were stayed by the United States Supreme Court on December 4, 2017, effectively revoking the lower courts' decisions against the president (Justices Ginsburg and Sotomayor opposed the stay).

This version was sometimes called "Travel Ban 3.0."

=== Presidential Proclamation 9723 ===
On April 13, 2018, a proclamation removed the travel restrictions on nationals of Chad.

=== Presidential Proclamation 9983 ===
On February 21, 2020, a presidential proclamation came into effect adding restrictions on nationals of additional countries. It provided that the United States would stop granting immigrant visas for nationals of Eritrea, Kyrgyzstan, Burma/Myanmar and Nigeria as immigrants, and would suspend participation of Sudanese and Tanzanian nationals in the Diversity Visa Program. Reasons for inclusion were focused on identity-management and information-sharing issues.

Travel bans under Executive Order 13780 and related proclamations
Country	Immigration categories	Effective date	Termination
Iran	All	June 26, 2017 (Note: Before December 4, 2017, this ban only applied to people without a "bona fide relationship with a person or entity in the United States".)	September 24, 2017
Iran	All except on student (F or M) or exchange visitor (J) visas	September 24, 2017	January 20, 2021
Libya	All	June 26, 2017	September 24, 2017
Libya	Immigrants, or on tourist or business visas	September 24, 2017	January 20, 2021
Somalia	All	June 26, 2017	September 24, 2017
Somalia	Immigrants	September 24, 2017	January 20, 2021
Sudan	All	June 26, 2017	September 24, 2017
Sudan	Diversity immigrants	February 21, 2020	January 20, 2021
Syria	All	June 26, 2017	January 20, 2021
Yemen	All	June 26, 2017	September 24, 2017
Yemen	Immigrants, or on tourist or business visas	September 24, 2017	January 20, 2021
Chad	Immigrants, or on tourist or business visas	October 18, 2017	April 13, 2018
North Korea	All	October 18, 2017	January 20, 2021
Venezuela	Officials of the following government agencies, and their immediate family members, on tourist or business visas: Ministry of Interior, Justice and Peace; Administrative Service of Identification, Migration and Immigration; Scientific, Penal and Criminal Investigation Service Corps; Bolivarian Intelligence Service; Ministry of Foreign Affairs	October 18, 2017	January 20, 2021
Eritrea	Immigrants, except those eligible due to having provided assistance to the U.S. government	February 21, 2020	January 20, 2021
Kyrgyzstan	Immigrants, except those eligible due to having provided assistance to the U.S. government	February 21, 2020	January 20, 2021
Myanmar	Immigrants, except those eligible due to having provided assistance to the U.S. government	February 21, 2020	January 20, 2021
Nigeria	Immigrants, except those eligible due to having provided assistance to the U.S. government	February 21, 2020	January 20, 2021
Tanzania	Diversity immigrants	February 21, 2020	January 20, 2021

== Legal challenges ==
=== Challenges to Executive Order 13780 ===
==== State of Washington and State of Minnesota v. Trump ====
State of Washington and State of Minnesota v. Trump
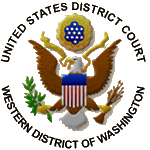
- Court: United States District Court for the Western District of Washington
- Full case name: State of Washington and State of Minnesota, Plaintiffs, v. Donald J. Trump, in his official capacity as President of the United States; U.S. Department of Homeland Security; John F. Kelly, in his official capacity as Secretary of the Department of Homeland Security; Tom Shannon, in his official capacity as Acting Secretary of State; and the United States of America, Defendants.
- Citation: No. 2:17-cv-00141; No. 17-35105

On March 9, Washington Attorney General Bob Ferguson indicated that the State of Washington would pursue obtaining a temporary restraining order and a preliminary injunction to block the Executive Order 13780 Ferguson publicly stated, "It's my duty, my responsibility to act. We're not going to be bullied by threats and actions by the federal government". The State of Washington indicated it would ask for a temporary restraining order and a preliminary injunction in the current proceedings related to Executive Order 13769 by asking the Court for leave to file an amended complaint to address Executive Order 13780. Ferguson also indicated that the states of Oregon, Massachusetts, and New York would ask for leave from the Court to join the current lawsuit against the executive order.

On March 9, 2017, White House press secretary Sean Spicer responded to the criticism of the order from several state attorneys general, and stated that the White House was confident the new order addressed the issues raised by the states in litigation involving the previous Executive Order 13769. Spicer stated, "I think we feel very comfortable that the executive order that was crafted is consistent with—we’re going to go forward on this—but I think by all means, I don’t—we feel very confident with how that was crafted and the input that was given”.

On March 13, 2017, the Washington State Attorney General filed a second amended complaint addressing Executive Order 13780 and moved the court to enjoin enforcement of the order under the current preliminary injunction previously issued which barred enforcement of Executive Order 13769 by filing a motion for emergency enforcement of the preliminary injunction. The State of Washington in their second amended complaint asked the Court to declare that sections 3(c), 5(a)–(c), and 5(e) of the first Executive Order (13769) are unauthorized by, and contrary to, the Constitution and laws of the United States, and that the United States should be enjoined from implementing or enforcing sections 3(c), 5(a)–(c), and 5(e) of the first Executive Order, including at all United States borders, ports of entry, and in the issuance of visas, pending further orders from this Court. The State of Washington also asked the Court to declare that sections 2(c) and 6(a) of the second Executive Order (13780) are unauthorized by and contrary to the Constitution and laws of the United States, and that the United States should also be enjoined from implementing or enforcing sections 2(c) and 6(a) of the second Executive Order, including at all United States borders, ports of entry, and in the issuance of visas, and enjoin the United States from implementing or enforcing section 5(d) of the first Executive Order and enjoin the United States from implementing or enforcing section 6(b) of the second Executive Order. The Court subsequently issued an order directing the United States to file a response to the emergency motion to enforce the preliminary injunction by March 14, 2017.

The federal defendants argued that the court’s injunction did “not limit the [federal] government’s ability to immediately begin enforcing the new executive order”, while the State of Washington has replied that “while the provisions differ slightly from their original incarnation, the differences do not remove them from the ambit of this court's injunction”. As of the evening of March 10, neither side had filed a motion to uphold or stop the new order, and Judge Robart said he would not rule on the matter without one.

On March 17, 2017, U.S. District Judge James Robart declined to grant an additional restraining order because he regarded such an action as unnecessary given that the President's new executive order was already blocked by U.S. District Judge Derrick Watson in Hawaii.

Maryland also intended to challenge the order in court, citing the order's future harm to its competitiveness academically and economically in the form of hindering visits by academics, scientists and engineers from other countries.

==== Hawaii v. Trump ====
State of Hawaii v. Donald J. Trump
- Court: United States District Court for the District of Hawaii
- Full case name: State of Hawaii and Ismail Elshikh, Plaintiffs, v. Donald J. Trump, in his official capacity as President of the United States of America, et al., Defendants
- Citation: No. 1:17-cv-00050

On March 7, 2017, the State of Hawaii brought a civil action challenging Executive Order 13780, asking for declaratory judgment and an injunction halting the order. The State of Hawaii moved for leave to file an Amended Complaint pertaining to Executive Order 13780. Doug Chin, Hawaii's Attorney General, publicly stated, "This new executive order is nothing more than Muslim Ban 2.0. Under the pretense of national security, it still targets immigrants and refugees. It leaves the door open for even further restrictions.” Hawaii's legal challenge to the revised ban cited top White House advisor Stephen Miller as saying the revised travel ban was meant to achieve the same basic policy outcome as the original.

The Amended Complaint listed eight specific causes of action pertaining to Executive Order 13780:

1. Violation of the First Amendment Establishment Clause claiming the travel ban targeted Muslims
2. Violation of the Fifth Amendment Equal Protection Clause
3. Violation of the Fifth Amendment Substantive Due Process clause
4. Violation of the Fifth Amendment Procedural Due Process clause
5. Violation of the Immigration and Nationality Act 8 U.S.C. § 1152(a)(1)(A), 8 U.S.C. § 1182(f) and 8 U.S.C. § 1185(a)
6. Violations of the Religious Freedom Restoration Act 42 U.S.C. § 2000bb1(a)
7. Substantive Violation of the Administrative Procedure Act through Violations of the Constitution, Immigration and Nationality Act, and Arbitrary and Capricious Action 5 U.S.C. § 706(2)(A)–(C).
8. Procedural Violation of the Administrative Procedure Act 5 U.S.C. § 706(2)(D), 5 U.S.C. § 551(1), and 5 U.S.C. § 553

On March 15, 2017, United States District Judge Derrick Watson issued a temporary restraining order preventing sections 2 and 6 of Executive Order 13780 from going into effect. In his order, Judge Watson ruled that the State of Hawaii showed a strong likelihood of success on their Establishment Clause claim in asserting that Executive Order 13780 was in fact a "Muslim ban". Judge Watson stated in his ruling, "When considered alongside the constitutional injuries and harms discussed above, and the questionable evidence supporting the Government’s national security motivations, the balance of equities and public interests justify granting the Plaintiffs. Nationwide relief is appropriate in light of the likelihood of success on the Establishment Clause claim." He also stated, concerning the Order's neutrality to religion, that the government's position that Courts may not look behind the exercise of executive discretion and must only review the text of the Order was rejected as being legally incorrect, and that:

The notion that one can demonstrate animus [ill-will] toward any group of people only by targeting all of them at once is fundamentally flawed. [...] It is a discriminatory purpose that matters, no matter how inefficient the execution. Equally flawed is the notion that the Executive Order cannot be found to have targeted Islam because it applies to all individuals in the six referenced countries. It is undisputed, using the primary source upon which the Government itself relies, that these six countries have overwhelmingly Muslim populations that range from 90.7% to 99.8%.

In drawing its conclusion, the Court further quoted the Ninth Circuit appeal ruling on the original Executive Order (13769): "It is well established that evidence of purpose beyond the face of the challenged law may be considered in evaluating Establishment and Equal Protection Clause claims", and quoted in support of its findings, previous rulings that "Official action that targets religious conduct for distinctive treatment cannot be shielded by mere compliance with the requirement of facial neutrality" (Church of the Lukumi Babalu Aye v. City of Hialeah); "a facially neutral statute violated the Establishment Clause in light of legislative history demonstrating an intent to apply regulations only to minority religions" (Larson v. Valente); and that "circumstantial evidence of intent, including the historical background of the decision and statements by decision makers, may be considered in evaluating whether a governmental action was motivated by a discriminatory purpose" (Village of Arlington Heights v. Metropolitan Housing); ending with a comment that "the Supreme Court has been even more emphatic: courts may not 'turn a blind eye to the context in which [a] policy arose'" (McCreary County v. ACLU of Kentucky, ruled that a law becomes unconstitutional under the Establishment Clause if its "ostensible or predominant purpose" is to favor or disfavor any religion over any other). The Court also took into account numerous statements by the President and his team prior to and since election, which had directly stated that he sought a legal means to achieve a total ban on Muslims entering the United States, and a "dearth" of substantive evidence in support of the stated security benefits.

After Judge Watson's ruling, a Department of Justice spokeswoman said the administration would continue to defend the Executive Order 13780 in the courts. President Trump denounced the ruling as "an unprecedented judicial overreach", and indicated that the decision would be appealed, if necessary to the Supreme Court, stating, "We're talking about the safety of our nation, the safety and security of our people. This ruling makes us look weak."

On March 29, 2017, Judge Watson extended his order blocking the ban until the state’s lawsuit reached a resolution. The Department of Justice appealed this ruling. On May 15, a panel of the Ninth Circuit heard arguments on whether to uphold the nationwide injunction. Acting Solicitor General of the United States Jeffrey Wall and attorney for the state of Hawaii, Neal Katyal, appeared before Circuit Judges Ronald M. Gould, Michael Daly Hawkins, and Richard Paez for an hour of oral arguments in Seattle's William Kenzo Nakamura United States Courthouse.

On June 12, 2017, a unanimous panel of the Ninth Circuit partially upheld Judge Watson's injunction. In its anonymous per curiam decision, the court found President Trump's order violated the relevant statute, and must therefore be enjoined. However, the court found that Judge Watson should have avoided the constitutional question, and that he should not have enjoined the purely internal government vetting review.

On June 19, 2017, Judge Watson complied with the decision of the Ninth Circuit and curtailed the injunction such that the injunction would exempt, "internal review procedures that do not burden individuals outside of the executive branch of the federal government."

==== International Refugee Assistance Project v. Trump ====
On the same date that Judge Watson in Hawaii blocked parts of Executive Order 13780, Judge Theodore D. Chuang of the U.S. District of Maryland, who was formerly Deputy General Counsel for the Department of Homeland Security, issued an injunction that blocked the revised order's section 2(c), which sought to ban travel to the U.S. by citizens from six designated countries. The basis of Judge Chuang's order is violation of the Establishment Clause of the United States Constitution. Judge Chuang also noted that the order violated the Immigration and Nationality Act of 1965, which modified the Immigration and Nationality Act of 1952 to say "No person shall receive any preference or priority or be discriminated against in the issuance of an immigrant visa because of his race, sex, nationality, place of birth, or place of residence," but only in that it banned immigrant visa issuance based on nationality. Judge Chuang noted that the statute does not prohibit the President from barring entry into the United States or the issuance of non-immigrant visas on the basis of nationality. The Trump Administration appealed the ruling to the United States Court of Appeals for the Fourth Circuit, which scheduled oral argument for May 8, 2017; the Justice Department said it will file a motion to encourage the court to rule sooner. On March 31, approximately 30 top U.S. universities filed an amicus brief with the Fourth Circuit opposing the travel ban.

On May 8, 2017, acting Solicitor General of the United States Jeffrey Wall and American Civil Liberties Union attorney Omar Jadwat appeared before the 13-judge en banc Fourth Circuit for two hours of oral arguments in Richmond, Virginia's Lewis F. Powell Jr. United States Courthouse. Judges J. Harvie Wilkinson III, whose daughter is married to Wall, and Allyson Kay Duncan recused themselves.

On May 25, 2017, the Fourth Circuit upheld the March ruling of the Maryland district court, continuing the block of the travel ban by a vote of 10-3 because it violated the Establishment Clause of the United States Constitution.

The acting Solicitor General next applied for a stay of execution from the Supreme Court of the United States, which then scheduled all briefing to be concluded by June 21, the day before the Court's last conference of the term. Hawaii's outside counsel in a related case, Neal Katyal, told the Court he was "in Utah with very little internet access" for the rest of the week, so it granted him an extra day to file the state's response brief.

==== Other cases ====
The first temporary restraining order (TRO) issued against the revised travel ban came on March 10, 2017 from U.S. district judge William Conley in Madison, Wisconsin; the TRO suspended the executive order with respect to a Syrian refugee's wife and child living in Aleppo, Syria and seeking reunification in the United States.

On March 24, 2017, U.S. District Judge Anthony John Trenga in Alexandria, Virginia, refused to grant plaintiff Linda Sarsour a temporary restraining order against the President's executive order, finding that she was not likely to succeed in her challenge.

==== U.S. Supreme Court ====
On June 26, 2017, in an unsigned per curiam decision, the United States Supreme Court stayed the lower court injunctions as applied to those who have no "credible claim of a bona fide relationship with a person or entity in the United States". The Court also granted certiorari and set oral arguments for the fall term. The Court did not clarify what constitutes a bona fide relationship. Justice Thomas, joined by Justices Alito and Gorsuch, partially dissented, writing that the entirety of the lower courts' injunctions against the executive order should be stayed.

On June 29, the Trump Administration sent out a diplomatic cable to embassies and consulates seeking to define what qualifies as a "bona fide relationship", excluding connections with refugee resettlement agencies, and clarifying that step-siblings and half-siblings are considered close family for the purpose of exceptions to the executive order, while grandparents and nephews are not.

On July 14 in Honolulu, Judge Derrick Watson found that the President's limitations on refugee resettlement agencies and family definitions violated the Supreme Court's order, writing "grandparents are the epitome of close family members." On July 19, the Supreme Court issued a partial stay of the modified injunction, leaving in place Judge Watson’s order on family definitions. Justices Thomas, Alito, and Gorsuch said they would have stayed Judge Watson's entire order. The Court also scheduled oral arguments in the case for October 10.

On September 24, 2017, Trump signed Presidential Proclamation 9645, replacing and expanding the March Executive Order. The Supreme Court canceled its hearing, and Solicitor General Noel Francisco then asked the Court to dismiss the case and vacate the lower courts' judgments. On October 10, 2017, the Supreme Court did so with regard to the Fourth Circuit case. Justice Sonia Sotomayor dissented, saying the Court should not vacate the judgment of the lower courts but only dismiss their review as improvidently granted. Following the expiration of President Trump’s ban on refugees on October 24, the Supreme Court vacated the preliminary injunction and remanded the case to the Ninth Circuit with instructions to dismiss the case as moot.

The Supreme Court allowed the travel ban to go into full effect on December 4, 2017, pending legal challenges. Seven of the nine justices lifted the injunctions imposed by the lower courts, while two justices wanted the order to be blocked.

On December 22, 2017, a three-judge panel of United States Court of Appeals for the Ninth Circuit, ruled that President Trump's Executive Order "exceeds the scope of his delegated authority," to deem classes of people by their National Origin ineligible to enter the country under the Immigration and Nationality Act.

=== Challenges to Presidential Proclamation 9645 ===
==== U.S. District Courts ====
Plaintiffs in the Hawaii v. Trump and Int'l Refugee Assistance Project v. Trump litigations amended their complaints to challenge Presidential Proclamation 9645. On October 17, 2017, Judge Derrick Watson granted Hawaii's motion for a temporary restraining order against most of the Proclamation on the grounds it violated immigration statutes including 8 U.S.C. § 1152(a)(1)(A) which prohibits discrimination in the issuance of an immigrant visa on the basis of nationality. The next day, Judge Theodore D. Chuang in Maryland issued a nationwide injunction prohibiting enforcement of the Proclamation against those with a bona fide relationship to the United States on the grounds it violated both immigration statutes and the Establishment Clause of United States Constitution which prohibits the United States Government from making laws “respecting an establishment of religion, or prohibiting the free exercise thereof.

On December 4, the Supreme Court issued an order allowing Proclamation 9645 to take effect, blocking all lower court decisions from taking effect until after the Supreme Court rules on the matter, and encouraging both appeals courts to "render [their]decision with appropriate dispatch." Justices Ginsburg and Sotomayor voted against the brief, unsigned orders.

==== U.S. Courts of Appeals ====
On December 22, the Ninth Circuit affirmed the Hawaiian injunction against the Proclamation but limiting it to those with a bona fide relationship to the United States.

On February 15, 2018, the en banc Fourth Circuit affirmed the Maryland injunction against the Proclamation by a vote of 9–4. Chief Judge Roger Gregory, writing for the majority, found that the Proclamation likely violated the Establishment Clause of the U.S. Constitution. In his dissent, Judge Paul V. Niemeyer argued that the majority erred by considering comments made by President Trump. Judge William Byrd Traxler Jr., who had joined the circuit majority in May, now dissented. The Circuit Courts' judgments remained stayed by the December 4 Supreme Court order.

==== Supreme Court ====
On January 19, 2018, the Supreme Court granted the government's petition for a writ of certiorari in the Trump v. Hawaii case, appealing the Ninth Circuit decision. Oral hearings for Trump v. Hawaii (Docket 17-965) were heard on April 25, 2018, the first time that the Supreme Court had a hearing related to any version of the travel ban. Observers of the session believed that the five conservative judges sided with the government in enforcing the ban. The Court as a whole asked questions seeking to determine whether the ban equated to religious discrimination and whether it was within the President's power.

On June 26, 2018, the Court handed down its 5–4 decision which nullified the District Court's injunction. The majority opinion, written by Chief Justice Roberts, held that the issuance of the Proclamation was not likely to violate statutory law nor the Establishment Clause. Justices Kennedy and Thomas concurred.Justices Breyer and Sotomayor both filed dissents. Justice Breyer did not directly address the Proclamation's constitutionality, but merely called for the injunction to remain in place. Justice Sotomayor, however, explicitly would have held that the Proclamation did in fact violate the Establishment Clause.

== International reactions ==
=== Original Executive Order 13780 ===
Governments of the six countries subject to President Trump’s March 2017 Executive Order expressed overwhelming concern that the travel ban would adversely affect both individual citizens seeking to travel to the United States and diplomatic relations between the United States and those nations named in the ban. Several countries outrightly opposed the executive order and others instituted reciprocal measures.

On March 6, 2017, Iran's Foreign Ministry spokesman Bahram Qasemi stated that the government would wait for full details of the new executive order and "would react in proportion." Deputy Foreign Minister for European and American Affairs Majid Takht-Ravanchi stated that Iran would counter the ban, stating that their earlier countermeasures against Executive Order 13769 were still in place and added that there was no need for a new decision. After the United States Supreme Court allowed partial implementation of Trump's travel ban, Iran stated on June 28, 2017, that it would take "reciprocal" action in response. Its Foreign Minister Mohammad Javad Zarif later called the ban "shameful" stating it targeted "Iranian grandmothers".

Somalia's President Mohamed Abdullahi "Farmaajo" Mohamed criticized the travel ban after it was signed by President Trump, citing its potential harm to average Somalis. Farmaajo, himself a dual U.S.-Somali citizen, told the Associated Press that the Somali American community "contributed to the US economy and the US society in different ways, and we have to talk about what the Somali people have contributed rather than a few people who may cause a problem."

The self-proclaimed Republic of Somaliland's Foreign Minister Saad Ali Shire emphasized that Somalia and Somaliland as two different nations, stating that his nation should not be confused or conflated with Somalia. He claimed, "We don't have the troubles and problems with terrorism and extremism that they have in Somalia."

Sudan's Foreign Ministry stated it was disappointed by its inclusion in the travel ban on citizens from six Muslim-majority nations.

The United Nations stated that the ban would adversely affect the world's refugees. UN High Commissioner for Refugees, Filippo Grandi, stated that refugees were not criminals but “ordinary people forced to flee war, violence and persecution in their home countries” and that they should not be prevented from entering the United States on the basis of nationality.

Iraq’s Foreign Ministry expressed "deep relief" over exclusion of the country from the travel ban in a statement issued on March 6. It stated, "The decision is an important step in the right direction, it consolidates the strategic alliance between Baghdad and Washington in many fields, and at their forefront war on terrorism."

=== Modified order ===
Following Presidential Proclamation 9645 which further modified Executive Order 13780, affected countries continued to respond with concern and outrage. The Tobruk-based House of Representatives government in east Libya issued a reciprocal travel ban on all United States citizens on September 27, 2017, in retaliation to the travel ban on Libyans by the United States. It called the Trump administration’s travel ban a "dangerous escalation" that would affect all Libyans unfairly as it "places every citizen in the same basket as the terrorists".

Chad's government issued a statement in September 2017 asking the United States to reconsider its inclusion of the country in its travel ban, stating the decision to prevent Chadian nationals from obtaining immigrant visas to travel to the U.S. "seriously undermines the image of Chad and the good relations between the two countries." It “expresse[d] its incomprehension in the face of the official reasons behind this decision" and emphasized its efforts to combat terrorism both within its own borders and neighboring Nigeria in partnership with the United States. On September 25, Venezuelan Foreign Minister Jorge Arreaza characterized the country’s inclusion in the modified ban as an act of "new aggression" intended to sway public opinion in the United States against the Maduro government. Iran's foreign minister Mohammed Javad Zarif further criticized the travel ban on Twitter writing, "Trump’s fake empathy for Iranians rings ever more hollow, with his new and even more offensive travel ban against such outstanding citizens."

Sudan's Foreign Ministry stated on September 25 that the Sudanese government welcomed its removal from the list of countries included in the travel ban, regarding the modifications as "positive and important". The Foreign Ministry referenced the development of Sudan–United States relations, stating the decision was the result of prolonged and frank dialogue as well as joint efforts by both nations. It also reiterated its determination to remove obstacles to the normalization of relations with the United States.

The Somali government hired a U.S. lobbying firm, the Sonoran Policy Group (SPG) on August 21, 2018, that would help the lobbyists de-list Somalia from the Presidential Proclamation 9645 and to improve military and diplomatic relations with the United States.

== Revocation ==
Presidential Proclamation 10141 - Ending Discriminatory Bans on Entry to the United States

On January 20, 2021, President Joe Biden revoked Executive Order 13780 and its related proclamations citing its contravention of American values of religious freedom and tolerance and weakening of national security. The revocation also instituted the immediate resumption of visa processing for individuals barred from entering the United States under Executive Order 13780.

== See also ==
- Muslim immigration ban
- Day Without Immigrants 2017
- Ideological restrictions on naturalization in U.S. law
- Immigration reduction in the United States
- List of executive actions by Donald Trump
- List of citizenships refused entry to foreign states
- National Security Entry-Exit Registration System
- Patriot Act
- Protests against Donald Trump
- Refugees of the Syrian Civil War
- Travel bans under the Trump administrations
- United States Citizenship and Immigration Services
- Visa policy of the United States
