= Muslim immigration ban =

Restrictions on Muslim immigration to non-Muslim nations

A Muslim immigration ban is a ban, either absolute or from specific nations, on the immigration of Muslims to a specific nation.

== Background ==
An early example of a Muslim immigration ban in the New World was a restriction against the importation of Africans into the Americas by the English and Spanish colonialists. In addition, immigration restriction and exclusion acts, such as the Chinese exclusion case and Fiallo v. Bell, which targeted people based on their demographic group, strengthen the federal government's ability to exercise what is known as “Plenary Power” doctrine. A doctrine that allow for the restriction of the immigration of any group of people for the premises of national security.

Reasons for advocating a ban on "Muslim immigration" can include from being a side effect of nativism (according to Hawley).

Anti-Muslim Sentiment increased in the United States after 9/11, and this has influenced its spread in other countries it has influence in. As well as, created an increase support for greater restrictions on Muslim immigration and travel.

== United States ==
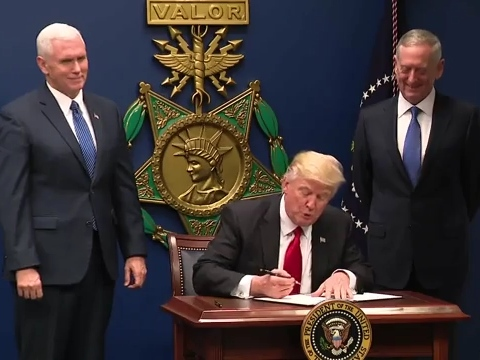
U.S. President Donald Trump signing the order at the Pentagon, with Vice President Mike Pence (left) and Secretary of Defense Jim Mattis in 2017

On December 7, 2015, presidential candidate Donald Trump called for "a total and complete shutdown of Muslims entering the United States until our country's representatives can figure out what the hell is going on." The Muslim immigration ban has been seen as a result of the influence of the counter-jihad movement.

As President, Trump signed Executive Order 13769 on January 27, 2017, the first travel ban, which "suspended for 90 days the entry of certain aliens from seven countries: Iran, Iraq, Libya, Somalia, Sudan, Syria, and Yemen." Further executive orders and presidential proclamations removed some of these countries and added others, including non-Muslim majority countries. Then after President Joe Biden was inaugurated, he revoked Executive Order 13769 on January 20, 2021, using the proclamation of Ending Discriminatory Bans on Entry to The United States.

Formerly, the Naturalization Act of 1790 did not restrict immigration of Muslims, but indirectly prevented Muslim immigrants from obtaining citizenship, which was limited to any "free white person". Whiteness was associated with Christianity by the American courts, until the decision Ex Parte Mohriez recognized citizenship for a Saudi Muslim man in 1944. The fear of foreign-born terrorism was seen as a justification for the extreme vetting measures. However, implementing laws that discriminate against a specific group of people could have substantial economical implications.

== Australia ==
A 2016 poll found that half of all Australians wanted to ban Muslim immigration, with 49% of Australians supporting a ban. In a 2017 poll of 2,000 people, 48% backed a ban, 27% were undecided, and a quarter opposed it.

In 2017, Senator and One Nation leader Pauline Hanson after the London terror attack called for a Muslim immigration ban, saying "do not pray for London, pray for Muslim ban". This came one year after her maiden speech called for the same ban.

In 2018, Senator Fraser Anning during his maiden speech called for a plebiscite to reintroduce the White Australia policy, especially with regard to excluding Muslims.

== India ==
Before he became the Chief Minister of Uttar Pradesh in 2017, minister Yogi Adityanath praised U.S. President Trump's position on a Muslim immigration ban and stated that “similar action[s] [are] needed to contain terror activities in this country.”

The Indian government introduced a migrant law (the Citizenship Amendment Act, or CAA) that excluded Muslims from applying for fast-tracked asylum (under claims of religious persecution) from Afghanistan, Bangladesh, and Pakistan.

== Netherlands ==
Geert Wilders is a prominent advocate for a ban on immigration from Muslim nations in the Netherlands.

== Russia ==
Long time Russian leader of Liberal Democratic Party of Russia, Vladimir Zhirinovsky had called for a ban on Muslim immigration.

== United Kingdom and Ireland ==
Opposition to immigration from Muslim countries has been widely debated in British and Irish culture. An opinion poll in 2017 found that around half of British people wanted to stop immigration from Muslim majority countries.

In the summer of 2024, anti-immigration riots rocked several parts of the UK in what was described as the worst rioting since the 2011 England riots. It was part of an uptick in riot activity, including the 2023 Dublin riots and 2024 UK riots.
