= Project Strike Back =

American counterterrorism program

Project Strike Back was an FBI and US Department of Education program created after the September 11th attacks to review the financial aid applications of college students suspected in terrorism investigations. This project, uncovered by student Laura McGann at the Medill School of Journalism, sought to discover if college aid money was being fraudulently obtained to finance terrorist plots. Through the Inspector General of the Department of Education, the FBI was able to scan millions of financial aid records, although they searched for only several hundred names in total. According to Freedom of Information Act requests, the program began just 10 days after September 11 and was discontinued in June 2006. The first FBI requests to the department began on September 24, 2001, but according to the Office of Inspector General, they diminished in the following years.
