= National Vetting Center =

United States government agency

National Vetting Center is a United States government agency established on February 6, 2018, to implement "vetting and tighter screening for all individuals seeking to enter the United States in order to help DHS (Department of Homeland Security) and the entire U.S. intelligence community to keep terrorists, violent criminals, and other dangerous individuals from reaching our shores."
