= National Security Entry-Exit Registration System =

U.S. non-citizen screening program

The National Security Entry-Exit Registration System (NSEERS) or INS Special Registration was a system for registering certain non-citizens within the United States, initiated in September 2002 as part of the war on terrorism. Portions were suspended as of April 27, 2011, and the entirety of the regulation was removed on December 23, 2016.

This system had two separate components: port-of-entry registration and domestic registration. In each case, those who registered were fingerprinted, photographed, and interviewed. They were required to provide detailed information about their plans and to update Immigration and Customs Enforcement (ICE) if their plans changed. They were only permitted to enter and depart the U.S. through designated ports of entry. On December 22, 2016 the Obama administration announced that it would dismantle the NSEERS regulatory framework, which would essentially cancel the program.

== History ==
The Bush administration started the program in September 2002. A goal of the program was to increase screening of travelers from specific countries. Because a majority of these countries were predominantly Muslim cultures, the American Civil Liberties Union said the program unjustly targeted individuals based on religion.

In January 2003 a Justice Department spokesperson said NSEERS helped law enforcement authorities apprehend 330 "known criminals" and three "known terrorists"; The spokesperson made these remarks in order to advocate for renewed funding for the program, for which the Bush administration was requesting $16.8 million per fiscal year. However, by 1 December 2016, "[n]o known terrorism convictions resulted from the program," according to a letter from some Democratic Members of Congress and New York Attorney General Eric Schneiderman. By January 2003, at least 138,000 individuals were registered in NSEERS, according to testimony by the Department of Homeland Security to Congress. As of May 2003, 82,581 individuals had complied with the domestic portion of the program. Of these, at least 13,153 were placed in deportation proceedings. Although the program originally included a requirement to re-register annually, the Department of Homeland Security, which gained jurisdiction over the program, eliminated this requirement.

Immigrant rights advocates such as Rabia Chaudry criticized the program, particularly the domestic portion of it, for profiling on the basis of ethnicity and religion as well as generally undermining immigrants' rights. They noted that 24 of the 25 countries included on the list are predominantly Muslim, while all of the countries are in Asia or Africa. The ACLU said that the program was ineffective due to it producing no terrorism-related convictions in the 93,000 cases it created. Given the large numbers involved and the nature of the requirements, they argued, it was unlikely to find any members of Al Qaeda. NSEERS was probed in the documentary film "Aliens Among Us", by Martina Radwan, for the effect it had on immigrant families of Arab origin.

=== Suspension ===
The system was discontinued in 2011 under the Obama administration, whereupon the Department of Homeland Security said that the registration system had become outdated in the wake of new technology.

NSEERS was indefinitely suspended as of April 27, 2011, when the US-VISIT program was instituted as its replacement. The Department of Homeland Security website said, "Because the Secretary of Homeland Security's authority under the NSEERS regulations is broader than the manual information flow based on country designation that has now ended, the underlying NSEERS regulation will remain in place in the event a special registration program is again needed."

=== Removal ===
On November 22, 2016, the American-Arab Anti-Discrimination Committee submitted a letter co-signed by nearly 200 organizations to President Barack Obama, calling on his administration to rescind the regulatory framework behind the NSEERS. The letter was submitted on behalf of nearly 200 civil and human rights, civil liberties, education, social justice, and inter-faith organizations, including the American Civil Liberties Union, the Leadership Conference on Civil Human Rights, American Immigration Council, Center for American Progress, National Council of La Raza, the National Immigration Forum, and the Southern Poverty Law Center. The letter reads in part, "As organizations that represent diverse communities and that are committed to civil and immigrant rights, we firmly believe that removal of the NSEERS framework is a necessary imperative. We ask the Administration to immediately take steps to remove the regulatory structure of NSEERS and stop any future use of the program."

The registration system was ordered to be removed near the end of the President Obama's second term in 2016. The removal order occurred after New York Attorney General Eric Schneiderman wrote, "We can't risk giving President-elect Trump the tools to create an unconstitutional religious registry." However, because the order occurred within the last 60 days of a President's term, if it is a "major regulation" (major social policy significance or cost of more than $100 million), it is subject to Congressional review (see Midnight regulations) and may be voided by Congress under the Congressional Review Act. Trump's advisers had suggested keeping the system to track immigrants. The Obama administration's order to remove the system said the program was redundant because it called for manual collection of data that is now captured automatically.

== Registration ==
Port-of-entry registration was required for nationals of Iran, Iraq, Libya, Sudan, and Syria (including those that were born in these countries but have a passport from a different country), in addition to any other non-citizen, non-permanent residents determined in advance by the United States Department of State or the INS, or as they enter the country by INS inspectors. According to the September 2002 notice signed by Attorney General John Ashcroft announcing the update to special registration in the Federal Register, some form of special registration was already in effect for the above countries as early as 1998. The new system began on September 11, 2002.

Certain non-citizens who were in the United States on or prior to September 10, 2002, were required to register in person at an INS office. This procedure was required of males over the age of sixteen who entered the United States legally on particular types of visa (primarily student, work, and tourist) from certain countries. Countries were named on four occasions:

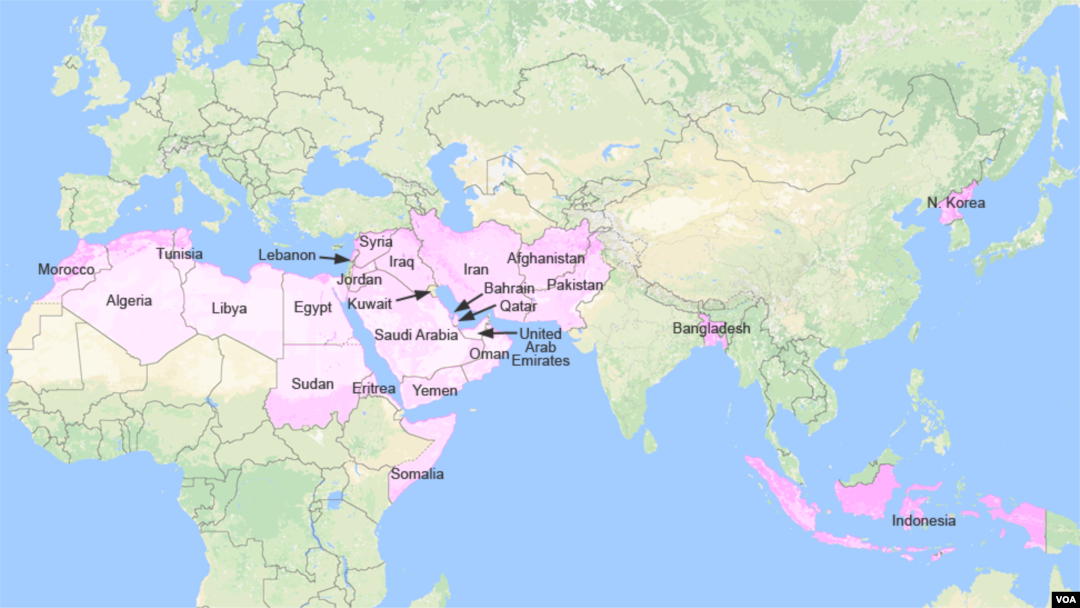
A map of countries which were subject to NSEERS.

- Group 1: Iran, Iraq, Libya, Sudan or Syria
- Group 2: Afghanistan, Algeria, Bahrain, Eritrea, Lebanon, Morocco, North Korea, Oman, Qatar, Somalia, Tunisia, the United Arab Emirates, Yemen
- Group 3: Pakistan, Saudi Arabia
- Group 4: Bangladesh, Egypt, Indonesia, Jordan, Kuwait

The deadlines for registration were December 16, 2002 (Group 1), January 10, 2003 (Group 2), February 21, 2003 (Group 3), and March 28, 2003 (Group 4). The deadlines for Group 1 and 2 registration were later extended to February 7, 2003. The deadlines for Groups 3 and 4 were extended to March 21, 2003 and April 25, 2003.

== See also ==
- U.S. government response to the September 11 attacks
- Patriot Act
