= Ending Discriminatory Bans on Entry to The United States =

US presidential order

Presidential proclamation
- Signed by: Joe Biden
- Signed: January 20, 2021

Ending Discriminatory Bans on Entry to The United States was the second presidential proclamation signed by President Joe Biden on January 20, 2021. The proclamation revoked Executive Order 13780, titled Protecting the Nation from Foreign Terrorist Entry into the United States, which had been signed by U.S. President Donald Trump on January 27, 2017, and proclamations 9645, 9723, and 9983.

== History ==
A presidential proclamation is a statement issued by a president on a matter of public policy issued under specific authority granted to the president by Congress and typically on a matter of widespread interest. Executive orders, presidential memoranda, and presidential proclamations are compiled by the Office of the Federal Register (within the National Archives and Records Administration) and is printed by the Government Printing Office which are published daily, except on federal holidays. A free source to get a copy of these documents is the Federal Register that contains government agency rules, proposed rules, and public notices. There are no copyright restrictions on the Federal Register; as a work of the U.S. government, it is in the public domain.

Ending Discriminatory Bans on Entry to The United States was proclaimed to revoke former President Donald Trump's series of executive orders and proclamations which banned travel from and restricted visas for immigrants from multiple countries.

== See also ==
- Trump travel ban
