= Voluntary departure (United States) =

Legal remedy available to certain aliens

Voluntary departure in the Immigration and Nationality Act (INA) of the United States is a legal remedy available to certain aliens who have been placed in removal proceedings by the former U.S. Immigration and Naturalization Service (INS) or the now Department of Homeland Security (DHS).

There is a related process called voluntary return or, in more formal parlance, administrative voluntary departure. This refers to a case where an alien is stopped from entering at a land border (by United States Border Patrol) and agrees to voluntarily return instead of undergoing expedited removal. A key difference between voluntary departure and voluntary return is that in the case of voluntary return, the alien never enters the United States, and therefore accrues no unlawful presence. The time between the alien arriving at the port and agreeing to return voluntarily can vary between a few hours and a few days, and throughout that duration the alien is under the supervision of either U.S. Customs and Border Protection or the carrier. Nonetheless, a number of commentators use the term voluntary return to refer to both voluntary departure and voluntary return. To add to the confusion, the U.S. Immigration and Customs Enforcement (ICE) uses the term "return" when reporting the number of voluntary departures.

Voluntary departure should also not be confused with withdrawal of application for admission, that occurs when an Arriving Alien who would be denied entry at a port of entry or deferred inspection site is asked to withdraw his or her application instead of receiving an order of removal.

The term voluntary departure is also used in immigration enforcement in other countries, such as the United Kingdom, with a broadly similar meaning. However, the precise meaning and details surrounding the term differ significantly by country. This page is specifically about voluntary departure in the United States context.

== Types of voluntary departure ==
There are three stages at which voluntary departure may happen:

- Voluntary departure while in removal proceedings prior to immigration court hearing. This requires the consent both of the alien and the ICE officer processing the alien.
- Voluntary departure at the first appearance in court, i.e., during the Master Calendar Hearing. This requires the consent of the alien as well as the Immigration Judge (IJ).
- Voluntary departure at the conclusion of the removal proceedings, after the alien has been found removable from the United States. This requires the consent of both the alien and the IJ, and the alien needs to satisfy more requirements to be allowed to depart voluntarily at this stage.

In addition, it is possible for an alien to proactively contact the ICE office and request voluntary departure despite not currently being in removal proceedings. As in the other cases, the ICE may not grant the voluntary departure request and may instead put the alien in removal proceedings. This option is therefore rarely used, but it can help aliens who wish to leave the United States after a brief unauthorized entry establish more clearly the duration of their stay, and make for a more transparent immigration record for the future.

=== Voluntary departure while in removal proceedings prior to the hearing ===
This form of voluntary departure is used after the alien has been given a Notice to Appear (NTA) for removal proceedings, along with a list of charges against the alien. At this point, the responsibility for the alien falls with the ICE. In some cases, the ICE may detain the alien at a detention center. In other cases, the alien may be free on parole but still required to show up for the court hearing.

The ICE may, in its discretion, offer the alien the option of voluntary departure. From the perspective of ICE, the reasons for offering this option could include:

- Reducing the backlog of immigration cases
- Cutting down on the costs of detaining or monitoring aliens waiting for their hearing

From the perspective of the alien, the main reason to accept voluntary departure is:

- It does not carry with it the penalties associated with a removal order.
- It allows the alien to reunite with family and avoid the perils of being detained and in unlawful status.
- It prevents the alien from accumulating additional days of unlawful presence.

If an alien voluntarily departs at this stage, unlawful presence accrued up to that point is part of the alien's immigration record, and may create bars to re-entry depending on the length of unlawful presence. In particular, if the alien believes that his or her presence was not unlawful, or the alien believes that he or she may be eligible for some relief from removal (such as cancellation of removal or asylum) or may be eligible for Adjustment of Status despite unlawful presence (for instance, through the Legal Immigration Family Equity Act), then voluntary departure could be a bad choice from the alien's perspective. This is because these forms of relief or adjustment of status are only available if the alien is physically present in the United States.

Another option offered to some aliens, that is sometimes confused with voluntary departure, is stipulated removal. Stipulated removal means that the alien is removed prior to the hearing, and requires the consent of both the alien and the Immigration Judge. However, unlike voluntary departure, stipulated removal carries with it all the penalties associated with a removal order, including a five-year re-entry bar and the possibility of reinstatement of removal upon subsequent re-entry.

=== Voluntary departure during the Master Calendar Hearing ===
During the Master Calendar Hearing (the first day of the alien's appearance before the IJ) the alien may request to depart voluntarily. The Immigration Judge can decide whether to grant this request. As part of the request for voluntary departure, the alien concedes removability.

=== Voluntary departure at the conclusion of court proceedings ===
Here, the IJ allows the alien to depart voluntarily after concluding, at the end of the court proceedings, that the alien is indeed removable. This form of voluntary departure is the hardest to obtain. In order to be eligible for this, the alien must:

- have been present in the U.S. for at least one year
- produce the required travel documents
- show the financial means to depart
- have been a person of good moral character for the previous five years, and
- post a bond in an amount set by the immigration judge.

== Steps ==
=== Alien and the authorities agree that the alien will depart voluntarily ===
The original suggestion for voluntary departure may come from the authorities or from the alien. Either way, both the alien and the authorities must agree to the voluntary departure. The order of voluntary departure has a date that may be determined flexibly based on the alien's request (but a maximum of 120 days after the date that the order is issued), giving the alien enough time to arrange his or her affairs prior to departing the United States.

=== Alien departs the United States ===
The alien must depart the United States by the date stated on the order of voluntary departure.

=== Failure to depart the United States has significant consequences for the alien ===
If the alien fails to depart on time, the following happen:

- The alien might have to pay a civil penalty between $1,000 and $5,000.
- The order of voluntary departure automatically becomes an order of removal, and may be executed as such by ICE. In particular, there is no scope for the alien to request removal proceedings.
- Ten-year bar to immigration relief, even, for instance, in cases where the Legal Immigration Family Equity Act would otherwise apply.

The Illegal Immigration Reform and Immigrant Responsibility Act of 1996 eliminated some exceptional circumstances where the penalties were waived. The only permissible exceptions are where the alien was not properly notified of the voluntary departure order.

== History ==
=== Prior to the IIRIRA ===
Voluntary departure began as an administrative process and was incorporated into the statutes in 1940. The 1940 statute provided for voluntary departure before removal proceedings in lieu of deportation to any alien "who has proved good moral character for the preceding five years." The alien could then "depart the United States to any country of his choice at his own expense." The Attorney General was granted the right to deny such relief to any individual whom the Attorney General reasonably believed fell into statutorily specified categories, including drug dealers, document falsifiers, subversives, criminals, and participants in Nazi persecutions. The Anti-Drug Abuse Act of 1988 additionally precluded the grant of voluntary departure to an alien convicted of an aggravated felony. Voluntary departure orders had a set date and most of them stated that, if the alien did not depart by the set date, the order would become a deportation order.

The Immigration Act of 1990 amended the Immigration and Nationality Act of 1965 to indicate that anybody who failed to depart by the date specified on the voluntary departure order would be ineligible for discretionary forms of relief such as voluntary departure, suspension of deportation (that would later be called cancellation of removal), Adjustment of status, registry, and change of nonimmigrant status for 5 years after the scheduled date of departure or the date of unlawful entry.

=== Changes with the IIRIRA ===
The Illegal Immigration Reform and Immigrant Responsibility Act of 1996 imposed dramatic restrictions on voluntary departure. This included the addition of civil penalties for failure to depart voluntarily, an increase in the ineligibility period for various forms of relief from 5 to 10 years, and a removal of various exceptional circumstances.

=== Substitution away from voluntary departure towards removal ===
In the mid-2000s, the United States, under President George W. Bush and U.S. Department of Homeland Security Secretary Michael Chertoff, made a number of changes to ramp up immigration enforcement. Examples of this ramp-up included completing the rollout of expedited removal to the entire border zone, phasing out catch and release, and starting Operation Streamline for criminal prosecution of repeat unlawful entrants and unlawful entrants with criminal backgrounds. These changes were continued by the next President, Barack Obama, with the support of DHS Secretary Jeh Johnson and U.S. Immigration and Customs Enforcement director John T. Morton.

A consequence of these change was an increasing degree of substitution away from voluntary departure and towards various forms of removal (included expedited removal and stipulated removal). Due to these changes, the total number of people who were subject to removal from the United States increased significantly, while the number of people "returned" (which includes voluntary departure) decreased; the total of the number of people removed and returned appears to have fallen since the recession of 2008.

== Reception ==
=== Reception of the existence of voluntary departure as an option ===
Voluntary departure as an option is highlighted by sources of legal advice as a better option than being removed. Commentators have pointed out that voluntary departure is not really voluntary and that in some cases it can be a bad option to exercise.

=== Reception of the decrease in use of voluntary departure ===
Groups supportive of greater rights for immigrants and expanded opportunities for immigration have been critical of the move away from voluntary departure and towards the use of removal.

Correspondingly, groups interested in combating illegal immigration welcome the shift away from voluntary departure towards removal orders.

=== Effect on the interpretation of deportation statistics ===
Groups supportive of greater rights for immigrants have viewed the increase in removals since the mid-2000s, that started under Bush and continued under Obama, as problematic, even though the total of removals and returns declined. The reasoning is that an order of removal carries significantly greater penalties than a voluntary departure.

On the other hand, groups interested in combating illegal immigration, while supportive of the shift away from voluntary departures to removals, have been critical of looking only at the increase in removal numbers rather than looking at the total of removals and returns, arguing that the sharp increase in removal numbers overestimates the increase in immigration enforcement under Obama.

== See also ==
- Withdrawal of application for admission
- Expedited removal
- Stipulated removal
- Reinstatement of removal
- Removal proceedings
