= Credible fear =

Concept in United States asylum law

Credible fear is a concept in United States asylum law whereby a person who demonstrates a credible fear of returning to their home country cannot be subject to deportation from the United States until the person's asylum case is processed.

== Historical context ==
Historically, the deportation of a person not lawfully present in the United States required the approval of an Immigration judge, unless it was based on an apprehension at the border itself. In November 2002, in order to speed up the process of deportation, the United States Department of Homeland Security expanded the scope of expedited removal to include those apprehended within 100 miles of the United States border and within 14 days of entry.

To address concerns that this might result in the deportation of people who might be eligible for asylum, the credible fear screening was introduced. According to the Congressional Research Service, "Consistent time series data on 'credible fear' claims" was only collected beginning in fiscal year 2005.

== Legal description of credible fear ==
=== Summary ===
The legal framework governing credible fear is described in the Code of Federal Regulations, Title 8 (Aliens and Nationality), 208.30 (8 CFR 208.30). According to the summary on the United States Citizenship and Immigration Services (USCIS) website: "An individual will be found to have a credible fear of persecution if he or she establishes that there is a "significant possibility" that he or she could establish in a full hearing before an Immigration Judge that he or she has been persecuted or has a well-founded fear of persecution or harm on account of his or her race, religion, nationality, membership in a particular social group, or political opinion if returned to his or her country."

=== Types of credible fear ===
There are two kinds of credible fear recognized in United States law:

- Credible fear of persecution: This is defined in Section 235(b)(1)(B)(v) of the Immigration and Nationality Act as "a significant possibility, taking into account the credibility of the statements made by the alien in support of his or her claim and such other facts as are known to the officer, that the alien could establish eligibility for asylum under Section 208 [of the INA]." Note that demonstrating a credible fear of persecution does not mean that the person has received asylum or definitively established eligibility for it. It simply means that the person stands a good chance of establishing eligibility for asylum.
- Credible fear of torture: The applicant must demonstrate "a significant possibility that he or she is eligible for withholding of removal or deferral of removal under the Convention Against Torture, pursuant to 8 CFR 208.16 or 208.17."

== Process ==
=== Initial contact ===
When a person enters the United States without authorization, United States Customs and Border Protection are, at initial contact, supposed to ask the person whether a credible fear of returning to their home country exists. If the person responds affirmatively, then the person cannot be immediately deported, but instead the person is referred to an asylum officer for a credible fear interview and issued a Form M-444 Information About Credible Fear Interview . If the person responds negatively, the person may be subject to expedited removal.

A person who has not yet come into contact with immigration enforcement (either because they are already present in the United States in lawful status, or because immigration enforcement hasn't yet found the person) may also apply for asylum of his or her own accord (this is sometimes called applying for asylum affirmatively). Such a person does not need to go through a credible fear interview. The credible fear interview is intended only for individuals who have been identified as candidates for deportation.

=== Credible fear interview ===
After initial contact, the person claiming credible fear needs to be given at least 48 hours before a credible fear interview with an asylum officer, unless they voluntarily waives the 48-hour waiting period requirement. In practice, due to a huge backlog of cases, the person may need to wait several days before getting an interview.

The credible fear interview is conducted by an asylum officer from the United States Citizenship and Immigration Services (USCIS) Asylum Division. The goal of a credible fear interview is not to make a final determination regarding whether the applicant should be granted asylum, but rather, to determine whether the applicant has a reasonable prima facie case that makes it plausible that the applicant could be granted asylum. According to the USCIS website: "An individual will be found to have a credible fear of persecution if he or she establishes that there is a "significant possibility" that he or she could establish in a full hearing before an Immigration Judge that he or she has been persecuted or has a well-founded fear of persecution or harm on account of his or her race, religion, nationality, membership in a particular social group, or political opinion if returned to his or her country."

The interview includes questions in the following domains:

- Background information including the applicant's birthdate, home country, and whether the person has any family ties in the United States.
- Credible fear of persecution questions: Questions related to persecution the applicant faced in his or her home country, including questions that probe whether the person's persecution is on account of criteria, such as ethnicity, religion, nationality, political opinion, or membership in a particular social group, that would be grounds for asylum.
- Credible fear of torture questions: Questions related to whether the applicant was tortured in his or her home country.
- Questions probing disqualifying criteria for asylum: The officer asks questions related to whether the applicant has tortured or persecuted others. Affirmative answers to these could disqualify the applicant.
- Opportunity for the applicant to add any more information.

In the credible fear interview, the burden of proof to demonstrate credible fear is on the applicant. There is no presumption in favor of credible fear.

The transcript of the credible fear interview is part of the applicant's asylum file and may be used by an Immigration Judge later when deciding whether to grant the applicant asylum.

Due to manpower and resource constraints faced by USCIS, over 60% of credible fear interviews are conducted telephonically.

=== Procedure after the credible fear interview ===
If the officer issues an unfavorable determination of credible fear to the applicant, the applicant may continue to be detained and may be deported for violation of immigration law.

If the officer issues a favorable determination of credible fear, then the applicant goes through regular removal proceedings. Specifically, the officer issues a Notice To Appear (NTA) to the applicant, directing the applicant to appear for his or her removal case in an immigration court, during which the applicant needs to make the case for asylum in full detail to the immigration judge. The applicant is now handled by U.S. Immigration and Customs Enforcement (ICE). After ICE files the NTA with the court, a removal hearing is held before an immigration judge. The applicant may have to wait for several months for a hearing due to the huge backlog of cases.

Applicants may wait for their hearing while detained or on parole. Immigrations and Customs Enforcement has the following guidelines regarding parole for people with a favorable determination of credible fear, who are waiting for asylum hearings:

- For arriving aliens (these are people who were apprehended while crossing the border): Effective January 2010, individuals with favorable credible fear determinations who can prove their identity and are not flight risks and do not pose a danger to the community, may be paroled from detention. They may also be paroled for urgent humanitarian or significant public interest reasons. Immigration judges do not have jurisdiction to review ICE's parole decisions.
- Those who are subject to expedited removal but are not arriving aliens may ask an immigration judge to set a bond for their release.

== Critical response ==
=== Criticism of CBP for not following procedure asking people if they have a credible fear ===
CBP has come under criticism for not asking people if they have a credible fear, and not referring people for a credible fear interview even when they had a good prima facie chance of passing one. A report by the Immigration Policy Center cited a number of attorneys as saying their clients were given misinformation by CBP about the credible fear process, with some even told that the US does not grant asylum to people from Mexico. Human Rights Watch has similarly claimed to find that CBP's initial contact does not follow procedural guidelines, and that it was failing to flag for a credible fear interview many individuals who were seeking asylum.

=== Criticism of credible fear interviewers ===
Credible fear interviews have come under criticism on the following counts:

- That the officers expect the applicants to be familiar with legal jargon such as the concept of particular social group. A lesson plan released in February 2014 for USCIS Asylum Office Directors and Asylum Officers was criticized as raising the bar unnecessarily high for the credible fear interview.
- That many credible fear interviews (over 60%) are conducted telephonically, with the applicant being interviewed in cramped and stressful conditions, and with translators also available only by telephone, making it hard to communicate clearly.

=== Criticism of the long wait times and continued detention ===
Immigration and Customs Enforcement (ICE), the agency responsible for detaining people, has been criticized for inconsistent and unnecessary detention of asylum applicants after a favorable credible fear determination has been found, and the continued detention of people while they wait for their hearings has been said to contribute to their post-traumatic stress disorder.

USCIS has also been criticized for long average wait times between the credible fear interview and the asylum case hearing. The average wait time, according to a 2014 report, was 578 days.

== See also ==
- Expedited removal
- Catch and release (U.S. immigration policy)
