= Withdrawal of application for admission =

Procedure of the US Department of Homeland Security

Withdrawal of application for admission is an option that U.S. Department of Homeland Security might offer to an Arriving Alien whereby the alien chooses to withdraw his or her application to enter the United States, and immediately departs the United States (or pre-clearance port of entry). Unlike an order of removal (including expedited removal as well as orders obtained as a result of removal proceedings), a withdrawal of application for admission does not create a bar to future entry.

== Types of withdrawal ==
=== For people who are not Lawful Permanent Residents ===
For people who are not United States Lawful Permanent Residents, withdrawal of application for admission is officially noted on Form I-275, Withdrawal of Application for Admission/Consular Notification. The Form I-275 has two pages. The first page includes the alien's biographical information and the reasons why the application would have been denied. The second page includes a signed statement by the alien acknowledging reading the reasons the application would be denied, and choosing to withdraw the application.

Additional forms that may be attached to Form I-275 include Form I-213 (Record of Apprehension or Interview) and Form I-862 (Notice to Appear).

=== For Lawful Permanent Residents ===
For Lawful Permanent Residents seeking re-entry, the LPR may be denied re-entry due to living outside the United States for over a year, or due to criminal activity that makes him or her inadmissible. In the case of LPRs who are being denied re-entry solely on account of living outside the United States for long but do not otherwise have any blemish on their immigration record, withdrawal of application for admission is usually offered as an option, both by CBP and by the Immigration Judge. The withdrawal of application for admission is entered on Form I-407, along with a Voluntary Relinquishing of Permanent Residence.

== Stages at which withdrawal may be sought ==
Withdrawal of application may be sought at any of these stages:

- Initial inspection at a designated port of entry, from U.S. Customs and Border Protection (CBP). This is the most common use of withdrawal of application for admission.
- Deferred inspection at a Deferred Inspection Site, from CBP.
- An Immigration Judge (IJ) while in removal proceedings.

=== Withdrawal of application for admission at the designated port of entry ===
Arriving Aliens undergo initial inspection at a designated port of entry (such as an airport, seaport, or land port; note that this does not include unofficial land crossings) by officers of the Office of Field Operations of U.S. Customs and Border Protection.

When an alien presents himself or herself for admission at a designated port of entry, the usual course of action is for a CBP officer to let the alien in. If the alien is entering on a nonimmigrant visa, a Form I-94 is issued, whereas if the alien is entering using the Visa Waiver Program, Form I-94W is issued. Lawful Permanent Residents are not issued any form upon re-entry. If the CBP officer believes that the alien should not be admitted, the alien may be taken in for extended questioning, after which the alien may either be allowed to enter the United States, or face one of these fates:

- Withdrawal of application for admission/consular notification: Here, the applicant withdraws the application to enter the United States. If the entry was visa-based, the corresponding visa may or may not be canceled, depending on the specifics.
- Expedited removal
- Removal proceedings that involve a hearing before an Immigration Judge (this is quite rare for arriving aliens, since any arriving alien deemed removable can be removed through expedited removal).

At land borders, voluntary departure and voluntary return may also be available options.

The option of withdrawal of application for admission is offered by CBP at the discretion of the officers involved. The following factors are considered when making the decision, as per the instructions in Section 17.2 of CBP's Inspector's Field Manual:

- Seriousness of the immigration violation: The more serious the violation, the less likely it is that CBP allows a withdrawal of application for admission.
- Previous findings of inadmissibility against the applicant: Past findings of inadmissibility make it unlikely that a withdrawal of application for admission be granted.
- Intent of the person to violate the law: Persons who are suspected of having intent to violate the law are unlikely to be allowed to withdraw their application than those who appear to have made an honest mistake.
- Ability to overcome the ground of inadmissibility: If it is believed that the alien would be admissible to the United States with somewhat different documentation (such as a different kind of visa, or a waiver), CBP is more likely to allow the alien to withdraw the application for admission.
- Age or poor health of applicant: Aliens in poor health are more likely to be allowed to withdraw their application for admission.
- Other humanitarian or public interest considerations: Such considerations, where applicable, may lead CBP to be more willing to allow a withdrawal of application for admission than it otherwise would.

In summary, withdrawal of application for admission is suitable for cases where an alien may have innocently or through ignorance, misinformation, or bad advice, obtained an inappropriate visa but has not concealed the true purpose of the trip. For instance, an alien who entered on a visa whose expiration date is not yet reached, but that is no longer valid because the underlying status is now void, may be asked to withdraw the application for admission. For lawful permanent residents, the option to withdraw the application for admission may be offered in cases where the LPR appears to be inadmissible on account of having been outside the United States for a long period of time.

In the case of a withdrawal of application for admission at a designated port of entry, the applicant must depart immediately. Generally, the alien stays in the custody of either CBP or the air or sea carrier throughout the process. In addition to issuing Form I-275 or I-407 indicating withdrawal of application for admission, the CBP also issues:

- Form I-259 to the alien's air or sea carrier (in the case of aliens entering at air or sea ports) telling the carrier to return the alien by a specified date.
- Form I-94, endorsing both sections with "WD - Application for Admission WIthdrawn. (Stamp Number), (Port), and (Date)." In addition, Block 20 indicates the file number of the alien's case, Block 26 specifies the grounds of inadmissibility, the withdrawal form served, and the flight or ship by which the alien is expected to depart.

=== Withdrawal of application at a deferred inspection site ===
Deferred inspection means that the officer at the port of entry, rather than making a final decision on whether to admit the applicant, defers the decision, asking the applicant to show up for an interview at a CBP office with additional documentation and for a final decision, as described in Section 17.1 of the CBP's Inspector's Field Manual. The onward office where the deferred inspection is carried out uses the same criteria for determining whether to allow the applicant to withdraw the application for admission as the CBP officers at the port of entry do.

=== Withdrawal of application for admission with the consent of an immigration judge ===
It is sometimes possible for the Immigration Judge (IJ) to allow the alien to withdraw the application for admission during removal proceedings. Note that this applies only to Arriving Aliens, who were never admitted into the United States, but rather were stopped by CBP at the time of attempted entry and placed in removal proceedings. Usually, the consent of the U.S. Department of Homeland Security is necessary in order for the applicant to be allowed to withdraw the application at this stage. The IJ cannot grant permission to withdraw until he or she is satisfied:

1. that the individual possesses both the means and intent to depart immediately; and
2. that the individual has established that factors directly relating to the issue of inadmissibility indicate that granting withdrawal would be in the interest of justice.

== Consequences ==
=== Entry in the alien's immigration record ===
The Form I-275 (and for people entering as LPRs, Form I-407) becomes part of the alien's immigration record, potentially affecting future attempts to be admitted to the United States or apply for visas.

=== Effect on validity of documents used for seeking admission ===
A withdrawal of application for admission does not automatically invalidate the documents used (if any) to seek admission.

In cases of application for admission using an entry visa, the visa remains intact where the reason for inadmissibility does not extend to invalidating the visa. An example would be if the alien simply forgot to bring along all the necessary documentation while traveling but has it at home. On the other hand, if the reason for inadmissibility also implies that the visa should not be issued, the visa is invalidated and the applicant needs to apply for a visa again with the consulate. Regardless of whether the visa is invalidated, the withdrawal of application for admission does not directly invalidate any underlying USCIS application or petition (such as Form I-129 or Form I-130), or other form (such as Form I-20 for students) that was a prerequisite to obtaining the visa.

== History ==
=== Prior to the IIRIRA ===
Prior to the Illegal Immigration Reform and Immigrant Responsibility Act of 1996, withdrawal of application for admission was not recognized in any statute or regulation. The rules surrounding it were only articulated in Board of Immigration Appeals (BIA) decisions. Some important decisions were:

- Matter of Vargas-Molina (1971) recognized that an Immigration Judge (IJ) could discretionarily allow an alien to withdraw the application for admission during removal proceedings. However, in order for this to happen, the alien needed to convince the IJ that it was in the best interests of justice.
- Matter of Gutierrez (1988) clarified that the alien needed to demonstrate to the IJ that he or she would immediately depart the United States in order to be able to withdraw the application. It also clarified that withdrawal of application for admission should not be construed as a form of relief from removal. Further, if excludability (now called inadmissibility) were established, the approval of the INS (now the U.S. Department of Homeland Security) was needed to allow withdrawal.

=== Withdrawal of application for admission as recognized in the IIRIRA ===
The Illegal Immigration Reform and Immigrant Responsibility Act of 1996 officially recognized withdrawal of application for admission. It stated that withdrawal of application for admission was a discretionary option that the Attorney General could offer at any time in lieu of either expedited removal or removal proceedings.

=== Use of this procedure after Donald Trump's executive orders on January 27, 2017 ===
On January 27, 2017, United States President Donald Trump issued Executive Order 13769, immediately forbidding the entry into the United States of people from seven countries on the list of State Sponsors of Terrorism. Some people from these countries, who had obtained visas prior to the order and were en route to the United States at the time of the order, were inadmissible into the United States, but not through any fault of their own. The CBP Office of Field Operations officers at the ports of entry offered some of these people the option to withdraw their application for admission.

== Comparison with other procedures ==
=== Comparison with removal procedures ===
Withdrawal of application for admission is an alternative to expedited removal (when carried out by CBP) or removal proceedings (when carried out by the Immigration Judge). Whereas withdrawal of application for admission requires the consent of both the authorities (CBP or the Immigration Judge) and the alien, expedited removal does not require the alien's consent. An alien who refuses to withdraw the application for admission may instead be subject to expedited removal (by the CBP) or removal through an order by the Immigration Judge.

Other ways an alien may receive an order of removal include stipulated removal (requires the consent of the alien and the Immigration Judge), reinstatement of removal (only applicable to somebody who re-enters unlawfully after having previously being removed), and removal proceedings (order given by the Immigration Judge).

An alien who receives an order of removal is subject to a re-entry bar that may be five, ten, or twenty years depending on the circumstances. In contrast, there are no re-entry bars in case of withdrawal of application for admission.

The main disadvantage of a withdrawal of application for admission is that it constitutes consent on the alien's part to the charges made in the Form I-275, and therefore makes it harder for the alien to challenge or appeal the finding. Expedited removal orders can be challenged with the CBP (though not appealed) and the findings of removal proceedings allow for appeals with the Board of Immigration Appeals.

=== Comparison with voluntary return ===
Another option that is somewhat similar to withdrawal of application for admission is voluntary return. The two are similar in the following respects:

- In both cases, the alien does not formally enter the United States.
- Neither of them involves a removal order, and therefore neither carries the re-entry bar (5, 10 or 20 years) associated with a removal order.
- Both of them are offered discretionarily by the U.S. Department of Homeland Security, usually the U.S. Customs and Border Protection officer at the port of entry or deferred inspection site.
- Both of them require consent from the alien as well, though if the alien fails to consent, he or she may be subject to expedited removal instead, which carries more severe penalties.

However, the two differ somewhat in the context where they are offered:

- Withdrawal of application for admission applies only to Arriving Aliens who present themselves for admission at a port of entry, whereas voluntary return applies to people apprehended or stopped at a land border. In particular, the offices within CBP that handle these are different: withdrawal of application for admission is handled by the CBP Office of Field Operations whereas voluntary returns are handled by United States Border Patrol.
- Withdrawal of application for admission is typically granted only in cases where the CBP officer involved genuinely believes that the alien did not engage in misrepresentation or try to break the law or conceal information, but voluntary return may be granted even in cases where it is believed that the applicant may have been trying to violate immigration law.
- Withdrawal of application for admission is carried out through the issuing of immigration forms (I-275, etc.) whereas voluntary return requires no signed statement and in general involves less formality.

=== Comparison with voluntary departure ===
Like withdrawal of application for admission and voluntary return, voluntary departure requires the alien to leave the United States, but does not put a removal order on the alien's record, thereby avoiding the bars to entry that a removal order would create. However, voluntary departure differs from the other processes in that its scope is not merely limited to arriving aliens. It can also apply to aliens who were admitted to the United States lawfully or entered unlawfully. Any days of unlawful presence acquired are not removed if the alien undergoes voluntary departure.

== See also ==
- Voluntary departure (United States)
- Expedited removal
- Removal proceedings
