= Legal Immigration Family Equity Act =

U.S. law

- Long title: Title XI—Encouraging Immigrant Family Reunification
- Enacted by: the 106th United States Congress

Citations
- Public law: Pub. L. 106-553, title XI
- Statutes at Large: 114 Stat. 2762A-142

Legislative history
- Introduced in the House as H.R. 5548 by Harold Rogers on October 25, 2000; Signed into law by President Bill Clinton on December 21, 2000

The Legal Immigration Family Equity Act of 2000, also known as the LIFE Act and as the Legal Immigration and Family Equity Act, along with its Amendments, made some changes to laws surrounding immigration for family members of United States citizens and Lawful Permanent Residents, as well as people eligible for employment-based immigrant visas, in the direction of making it easier for family members and immigrant workers to move to and adjust status within the United States. It was passed on December 21, 2000, as title XI of Pub. L. 106–553 (text) (PDF).

== Family-based and employment-based immigration and the development of long waiting times ==
The basic framework for family-based and employment-based immigration was laid out in the Immigration and Nationality Act of 1965, and the categories were expanded, with a clear preference ordering, with the Immigration Act of 1990.

The INA placed a limit of 20,000 on the number of immigrants from each country of chargeability within each year. For large countries in particular (such as India, China, and Mexico), this limit was much less than the number of people who sought to migrate through family-based and employment-based migration. This led to many cases of people who had approved petitions for family-based or employment-based immigration but needed to wait several years in order to be able to legally immigrate or adjust status to that of Lawful Permanent Resident. Some of these people stayed in the United States, going out of status, while others waited outside the United States for long periods of time.

== Growth of the removal/deportation machinery ==
Until the 1980s, most removals of unauthorized aliens happened through formal removal proceedings that involved a hearing before an immigration judge. However, in the 1990s, the United States government decided to add to its toolkit of removal strategies to deal with the scale of presence of unauthorized aliens, a trend that has continued through the 2000s and 2010s. Some of the summary removal procedures introduced over this time include expedited removal (launched 1996/1997), stipulated removal (launched 1995), reinstatement of removal (launched 1998), and administrative removal for aggravated felons (introduced 1988, expanded with the Antiterrorism and Effective Death Penalty Act of 1996, and the Illegal Immigration Reform and Immigrant Responsibility Act of 1996).

== Previous steps ==
In 1994, the United States Congress enacted Section 245(i) of the INA, permitting certain individuals who were otherwise ineligible for adjustment of status in the United States to pay a penalty fee for the convenience of adjusting status without leaving the United States. Prior to enactment of the LIFE Act Amendments, the window for preserving adjustment eligibility under Section 245(i) ended or cut off on January 14, 1998, after which only "grandfathered" individuals (beneficiaries of labor certifications or immigrant visa petitions filed on or before that date) were eligible to adjust status under Section 245(i). The cut-off date of Section 245(i) changed several times; however, then President Clinton signed into law a provision that changed the nature of Section 245(i) to "grandfather" those individuals in the United States for whom an immigrant visa or application for labor certification was filed on or before January 14, 1998.

== Legislative process ==
The original legislation that would eventually give rise to the LIFE Act was the Latino Immigrant Fairness Act (LIFA) sponsored by Democratic Party members. The LIFE Act emerged as a compromise after negotiation with Republican legislators who argued that while they were supportive of family reunification, they also wanted safeguards against incentivizing and rewarding the breaking of United States immigration laws. The LIFE Act was passed on December 21, 2000.

The LIFE Act was one of two major immigration-related legislations that was passed in late 2000. The other major legislation was the American Competitiveness in the 21st Century Act, that focused more on employment-based immigration and temporary worker statuses, particularly the H-1B visa.

== Provisions ==
The LIFE Act had four major provisions:

1. The USCIS would overlook unlawful entry and unlawful presence when considering some Adjustment of Status applications for people whose Form I-130 or Form I-140 had been filed by April 30, 2001 (with a number of additional caveats).
2. A new V visa was introduced for Form I-130 beneficiaries (primarily, spouses of United States lawful permanent residents) whose Form I-130 had been filed by December 21, 2000, and had waited for at least three years.
3. The K-3/K-4 visa category was introduced for spouses of citizens to be able to enter the United States, with authority to work and study, while their Form I-130 was still pending.
4. Persons who filed before October 1, 2000, for class membership in one of three "late amnesty" lawsuits (CSS v. Meese, LULAC v. INS, and Zambrano v. INS) and who are eligible under the LIFE Act's amended legalization provisions may apply to adjust status during a 12-month period that begins once regulations are issued. Spouses and unmarried children of the class action claimants will be protected from certain categories of removal and will be eligible for work authorization if they entered the United States before December 1, 1988, and resided in the United States on that date.

=== Overlooking of unlawful presence if other conditions for obtaining a Green Card are met ===
The LIFE Act allows some people to obtain Green Cards (i.e., adjust to Lawful Permanent Resident status) regardless of the following factors that might otherwise create bars to obtaining Green Cards:

- The manner they entered the United States
- Working in the United States without authorization
- Failing to continuously maintain lawful status since entry

The Act only applies to people who already had an approved petition that they had applied for by April 30, 2001. Explicitly, the following conditions need to all be satisfied:

- The applicant must be the beneficiary of a qualified immigrant petition (Form I-130 or Form I-140) or application for Permanent Labor Certification (necessary for some Form I-140) filed on or before April 30, 2001.
- In the case that the petition was filed between January 15, 1998, and April 30, 2001, the applicant must have been physically present in the United States on December 21, 2000. There is no requirement of physical presence for petitions filed earlier (which were already covered by previous versions of the ruling).
- The applicant is currently the beneficiary of a qualifying immigrant petition (either the original Form I-130 or Form I-140 or a subsequently filed immigrant petition).
- The applicant has a visa number immediately available. In the case of numerically limited categories, this means that the applicant's Priority Date must be current.
- The applicant is admissible to the United States.
- The qualifying petition or qualifying application for labor certification must have been "properly filed", (i.e., signed and submitted with the corrected fees) and "approvable" (meritorious based on the facts and "non-frivolous") when filed.

In order to apply under this provision of the LIFE Act, one must file Supplement A along with Form I-485 for Adjustment of Status.

It is also important to note that the petition used for Adjustment of Status may be different from the original petition with a date prior to April 30, 2001, that is used as a basis for being eligible for the LIFE Act.

There is also a penalty fee for the convenience of being able to adjust status without having to physically leave the United States that must be included as part of the application.

==== Relation with removal proceedings ====
Protection from removal proceedings (as well as from summary removal procedures such as reinstatement of removal) kicks in only after the Form I-485, along with Supplement A, has been properly filed and a visa number is available to the applicant.

Until then, removal proceedings may be initiated against the person for unauthorized entry or unlawful presence. If the person eligible under this provision of the LIFE Act departs the United States after accruing unlawful presence, the person may be subject to a 3-year or 10-year bar to re-entry (depending on the extent of unlawful presence) despite the fact that, had the person continued to stay in the United States, the person could have applied to adjust status.

=== V visa ===
The V visa is a visa category introduced as part of the LIFE Act. A person is eligible for a V visa if both these conditions are satisfied:

- A Form I-130 petition was filed on or before December 21, 2000, listing that person as beneficiary.
- It has been at least three years since the Form I-130 petition was filed, and the petition is either still being processed or has been processed but the associated immigrant visa or Adjustment of Status application is still pending.

While the V visa in principle applies to all categories listed on the Form I-130, it is rarely needed for people in the IR category (i.e., the spouses or immediate relatives of US citizens) because these are uncapped categories, so that a visa can be obtained within a few months of USCIS approval, and USCIS processing times are generally not more than a year.

The V visa is most relevant for the F category of Form I-130, which is numerically capped, and where the wait time for one's Priority Date to become current can be several years.

The V visa status may be obtained in these two ways, depending on where the beneficiary is:

- If the beneficiary is already in the United States, then he/she can apply using Form I-539 (Application to Extend/Change Nonimmigrant Status) along with Form I-693.
- If the beneficiary is outside the United States, he/she needs to go through consular processing, i.e., get a visa from a United States consulate.

The V visa allows the Form I-130 beneficiary to travel to the United States and engage in work and study there, while waiting for the Priority Date to become current so as to be able to apply for an immigrant visa and/or for Adjustment of Status.

Since the V visa applies only for Form I-130 petitions that were filed on or before December 21, 2000, its relevance has declined over time. Proposals to expand the scope to applications filed later have been stalled.

=== K-3/K-4 visas ===
K-3 and K-4 visas were created as part of the LIFE Act. These are non-immigrant visas intended for the spouse (K-3 visa) and dependents under age 21 of the spouse (K-4 visa) of a United States citizen. The following are the eligibility requirements for the K-3 visa:

- The visa applicant must be married to a United States citizen
- The visa applicant must have a pending Form I-130 petition filed by the U.S. citizen spouse listing him/her as beneficiary

A child may be eligible for the K-4 visa if he or she is unmarried, under 21, and the child of a qualified K-3 nonimmigrant visa applicant.

In order for the applicant to obtain the K-3 visa, the U.S. citizen spouse must file a Form I-129F listing the applicant as beneficiary (this is in addition to the pending Form I-130 petition).

The K-3 status (and any dependent K-4 status) automatically expires 30 days after any of these:

- The USCIS denies or revokes the Form I-130 petition
- The USCIS denies or revokes the Adjustment of Status application by the K-3 nonimmigrant
- The marriage is terminated through divorce or annulment
