= Removal proceedings =

Legal process prior to deportation from the US

In the United States, removal proceedings are administrative proceedings to determine an individual's removability under federal immigration law. Removal proceedings are typically conducted in Immigration Court (the Executive Office for Immigration Review) by an immigration judge (IJ).

== History ==
Prior to the passage of the Illegal Immigration Reform and Immigrant Responsibility Act of 1996 ("IIRIRA"), deportation proceedings were used to determine whether a person could be deported from the United States. When IIRIRA took effect in 1997, deportation proceedings were replaced by removal proceedings, though any cases begun before IIRIRA's effective date continue to be processed as deportation proceeding.

== Procedure ==
Persons in removal proceedings are called "respondents." Cases are decided by immigration judges, who are appointed by the Attorney General and are part of the Department of Justice. Removal proceedings are prosecuted by attorneys from the Department of Homeland Security ("DHS"), or more specifically, U.S. Immigration and Customs Enforcement.

=== Notice to Appear ===
Removal proceedings begin when an immigration attorney files a NTA with the immigration court. The respondent (typically an alien) is served with an administrative summons called a "Notice to Appear." The Notice to Appear is a dated document served by a U.S. immigration official (typically U.S. Immigration and Customs Enforcement or U.S. Customs and Border Protection) to a person suspected of entering the United States without inspection, remaining in the United States beyond the terms permitted by a visa, committing certain crimes which result in removability even if in lawful status, or otherwise being present in the United States unlawfully.

Among other things, a Notice to Appear contains a numbered list of factual allegations against the respondent. For example, a typical Notice to Appear might state:

1. You are not a citizen or resident of the United States
2. You are a citizen and national of [respondent's alleged home country]
3. You were admitted to the United States on [month], [day] [year] as a B visitor for a period not to exceed 180 days.
4. You remained in the United States beyond your term of admission.

These factual allegations may also list any crimes allegedly committed by the respondent in the United States, whether the respondent previously filed any applications with United States Citizenship and Immigration Services and their disposition, and if the respondent presently holds or previously held any lawful status. The Notice to Appear also contains a charge of removability, which is often a reference to which section of the Immigration and Nationality Act that DHS is attempting to use to remove the respondent. The Notice to Appear may or may not contain a court date for the respondent to appear and answer the charges contained therein. If no court date is listed, the respondent may be notified of the court date by mail or in person at a future date.

Failure to appear for a removal hearing will result in an in absentia order of removal being entered by the Immigration Judge absent extenuating circumstances for the respondent's failure to appear, such as a serious illness.

=== Master hearing ===
On the date of the removal hearing, also known as a master hearing or Master Calendar Hearing (sometimes abbreviated as MCH), before the immigration judge, the respondent may be represented by an attorney of his or her choosing. However, an attorney will not be provided by the court if the respondent does not secure his or her own counsel.

The respondent will be expected to answer the charges against him or her by pleading to the factual allegations and charge of removability contained in the Notice to Appear. Thereafter, if the respondent is eligible to apply for any relief from removal (such as asylum or cancellation of removal, among others), the respondent may request such relief and file any applications required for the relief. If the respondent is not eligible for any form of relief or if the respondent refuses to request relief from removal, the immigration judge may order the respondent removed from the United States.

The immigration judge will set a merits hearing date when respondents file an application for relief or express to the immigration judge seeking a specific form of relief not precluded by law. The merits hearing may be a matter of days or perhaps even more than a year later, depending on the type of relief requested and the particular court's docket. However, if the only form of relief from removal available or requested is voluntary departure, the immigration judge will most often grant or deny the respondent's request for voluntary departure on the same date of the request.

=== Merits hearing ===
At the merits hearing, also known as the "individual hearing," the respondent will be able to present his or her documentary evidence (which is typically required to be submitted to the court prior to the date of the merits hearing) for the court's consideration. The respondent may also testify in support of his or her application for relief, and may call witnesses. The Department of Homeland Security also questions the respondent and witnesses, and DHS may also call its own witnesses in some cases. At the conclusion of the merits hearing, the immigration judge issues a decision. This decision might be oral and given on the same day as the merits hearing, or written and served by mail on all parties at a later date.

If a respondent's application for relief from removal is denied by an immigration judge, the respondent may be eligible to appeal that decision to the Board of Immigration Appeals ("BIA") within 30 days of the date of the decision. If appealed, the respondent's removal proceedings continue at the appellate level at the BIA. If no appeal is filed and the immigration judge has ordered a respondent to be removed, the order removing the respondent becomes final 30 days after it has been entered by the immigration judge. A respondent with a final order of removal from an immigration judge is susceptible to being arrested and deported from the United States at any time.

== Types of aliens who appear in removal proceedings ==
There are three categories of aliens who appear in removal proceedings:

1. Arriving Aliens (these are people who were detained while entering the United States)
2. Aliens present without admission or parole
3. Admitted Aliens

== Features of the hearing ==
=== Burden of proof ===
In criminal proceedings, the legal burden of proof always falls on the prosecutor, i.e., the state. However, in removal proceedings, as is the case with other administrative proceedings, the legal burden of proof may fall on either side depending on the specifics of the charges. Specifically:

1. Arriving Aliens: As a general rule, the Arriving Alien bears the legal burden of proof of clear admissibility to the United States. However, in the case of Arriving Aliens who have previously been granted Lawful Permanent Resident status, there is a presumption in favor of granting them entry, with the exceptions being those aliens who satisfy one or more of the grounds of inadmissibility covered in INA Section 212. There is some legal ambiguity regarding who has the legal burden of proof here, but some legal scholars have held that the burden of proof falls on the prosecution in the case of LPRs.
2. Aliens Present Without Admission or Parole: This refers to people who entered unlawfully. In this case, once the prosecution establishes that the respondent is an alien, the burden of proof is on the respondent to demonstrate that he/she is in lawful status in the United States.
3. Admitted Aliens: This refers to aliens who were admitted lawfully. Here, the legal burden of proof of removability falls on the prosecution.

Regardless of the category, if the alien is claiming any relief from removal (such as asylum or cancellation of removal) the legal burden of proof for demonstrating eligibility for that relief falls on the alien.

=== Availability of a defending lawyer ===
For criminal proceedings in the United States (and in most other countries), the state has a responsibility to provide a public defender for the accused. However, removal proceedings are not criminal proceedings, and the state does not provide a public defender or compensate the respondent for the costs of an attorney. Respondents are allowed to defend themselves without the help of an attorney.

However, most immigration courts have set up programs where pro bono (free, volunteer) attorneys are available on the day of the master calendar hearing.

The pro bono attorney helps the respondent in the following ways:

- The pro bono attorney speaks on behalf of the respondent in court.
- The pro bono attorney helps the respondent determine how to respond to each of the charges in the NTA.
- The pro bono attorney helps the respondent determine whether to claim eligibility for relief from removal (such as asylum or cancellation of removal)

If the respondent's situation is complicated, the pro bono attorney may request a continuance on the respondent's behalf, so that the respondent can secure an attorney.

The pro bono attorney does not typically continue to represent the respondent for the merits hearing. Rather, the respondent is expected to find (and pay for) an attorney by that time.

=== How appeals work ===
Immigration decisions may be appealed by either side with the Board of Immigration Appeals. However, the BIA does not generally accept new evidence regarding the original case, but instead, simply aims to determine whether the previous court made an incorrect judgment based on the law or the facts available to it at that time. It is therefore critical that all the arguments and facts be presented in the original removal proceeding. BIA appeals are generally handled through paper, with physical hearings very rare.

Beyond the BIA, decisions may be appealed in the United States court of appeals for the jurisdiction where the removal proceeding was held. There is more flexibility regarding the sort of evidence that may be presented in these appeals but the court generally focuses on whether the original BIA decision was made correctly based on the information available, rather than re-adjudicating the facts involved.

== Removal without proceedings ==
The following are ways people may be removed without removal proceedings:

- Expedited removal: Here, an order of removal is issued by U.S. Customs and Border Protection and the alien is removed without an opportunity for a hearing before an immigration judge.
- Reinstatement of removal: Here, an alien is removed by reinstating a previous order of removal that had been executed (after which the alien re-entered in an unauthorized fashion).
- Stipulated removal: Here, the alien forgoes the right to a hearing before an immigration judge and agrees to be removed immediately. Aliens may do this to avoid lengthy periods of detention or legal limbo, and to reunite with their families.
- Administrative removal for aggravated felons: Those aliens who have committed aggravated felonies may be removed immediately after the completion of their prison terms.
- Title 42 expulsion: Under this law aliens may be removed if they recently have been in a location where a communicable disease was present. These expulsions are authorized under 42 U.S.C. § 265 and occur under the discretion of the U.S. Centers for Disease Control and Prevention. As of 2024, this authority has only been invoked during the COVID-19 pandemic.

Removal proceedings also should not be confused with Operation Streamline, that involves the use of federal criminal charges being pressed against aliens for unlawful entry. People who are found guilty through Operation Streamline courts generally have to spend a few months in prison, after which they are handed over to immigration enforcement. Generally, those found guilty under Operation Streamline are removed through expedited removal, but some of them may go through removal proceedings.

== Alternatives to removal ==
Some alternatives to removal that may be granted in some circumstances include:

- Voluntary departure
- Voluntary return
- Withdrawal of application for admission

== See also ==
- Cancellation of removal in the United States, formerly known as suspension of deportation
- Impediment to expulsion
- Right of return
