= Operation Streamline =

A U.S. government program that criminally prosecutes unauthorized border crossings

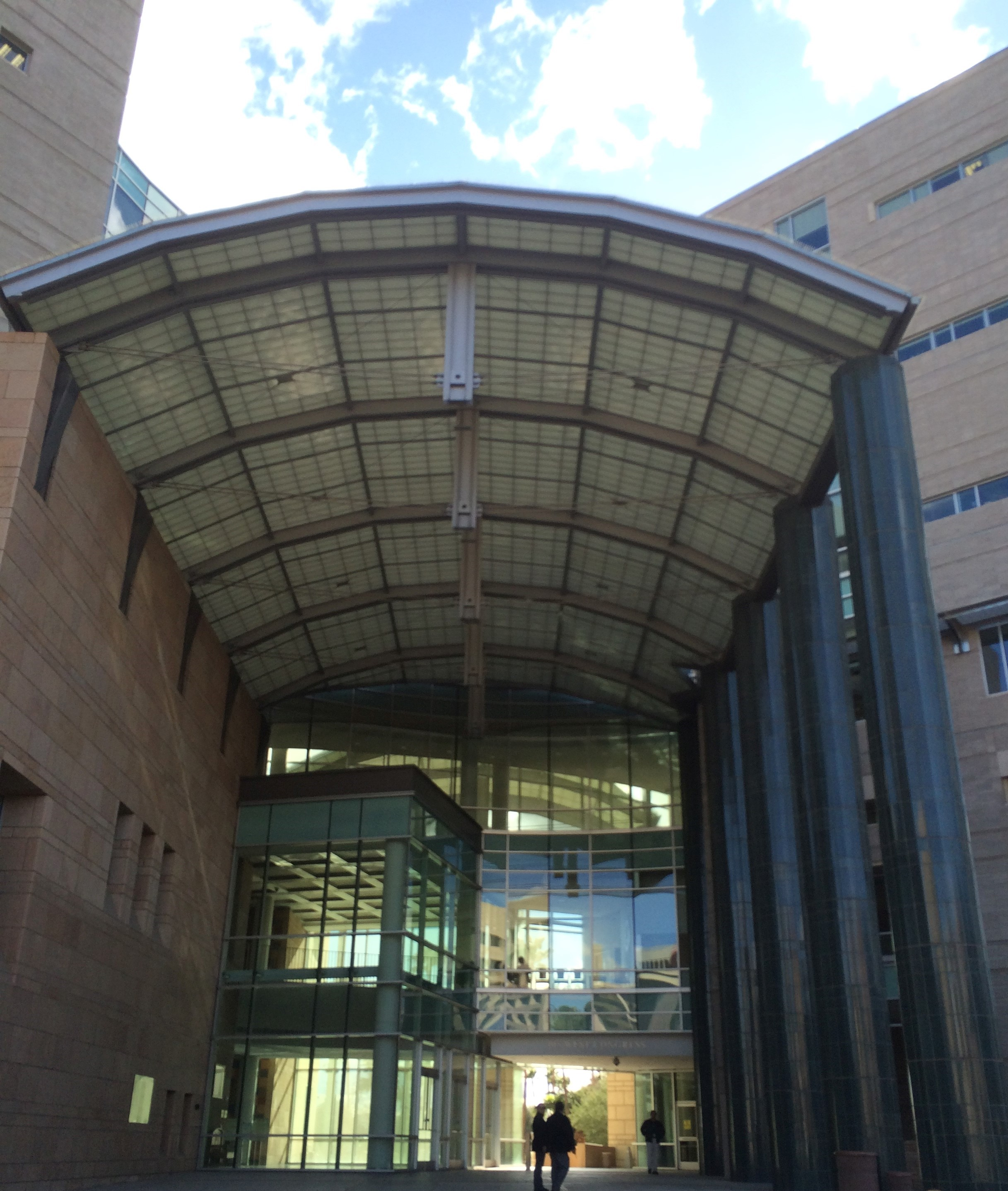
Federal courthouse in Tucson, AZ where Operation Streamline proceedings take place.

Operation Streamline is a joint initiative of the Department of Homeland Security and Department of Justice in the United States, started in 2005, that adopts a "zero-tolerance" approach to unauthorized border-crossing by criminally prosecuting those perpetrating it. Up to 70 people are tried at the same time, sometimes wearing shackles in the courtroom. Entering without inspection is a misdemeanor, and re-entering after deportation is a felony.

After launching Streamline at one sector of the Texas/Mexico border sector in 2005, the number of criminal prosecutions for illegal border crossing and/or re-entry quadrupled from around 4,000 annually in the early 2000s to 16,000 in 2005. The program expanded to several other sectors during the first term of the Obama administration and total prosecutions for first time offenders tripled to 44,000 in 2010 and by 2013, that number doubled to a peak of 97,000.

== Goals ==
Operation Streamline was created with the goal of combating drug trafficking, weapons trafficking, human smuggling, and repeat illegal immigration into the United States. Its ultimate goal is to achieve a 100% criminalization of unauthorized border-crossing.

== Program description ==
=== Regions of operation ===
All states on the U.S.-Mexico border except California have implemented the program. In 2010, the program was operational in the following border sectors: Del Rio, Texas, Yuma, Arizona, Laredo, Texas, Tucson, Arizona, El Paso, Texas, Las Cruces, New Mexico, McAllen, Texas, and Brownsville, Texas. By December 2014, only the Tucson, Del Rio, and Laredo sectors continued to participate in Streamline. However, the border sectors that discontinued the Operation Streamline program still continue to prosecute misdemeanor 8 USC § 1325 – improper entry by alien cases.

=== Criminal prosecution of illegal entry and re-entry ===
Under Operation Streamline, those caught in the act of crossing the United States border without authorization may be rounded up and subject to criminal prosecution. This is in contrast to the historical policy of catch and release and even to the policy of deporting people through expedited removal or after formal removal proceedings. Under Operation Streamline, immigration violations are processed under the criminal justice system.

The penalties that Operation Streamline carries for immigrants are as follows:

- First-time offenders are prosecuted for misdemeanor illegal entry (8 U.S.C. Section 1325) that carries a six-month maximum sentence.
- Any migrant who has been deported in the past and attempts to re-enter without authorization can be charged with felony re-entry that carries a two-year sentence but can involve up to a 20-year maximum if the migrant has a criminal record.

About 99% of people prosecuted under Operation Streamline plead guilty. According to The Washington Post, this is because those who plead guilty are likely to get substantially shorter prison terms than the theoretical maximum, whereas those who do not plead guilty are likely to get close to the maximum sentence.

The annual cost of Operation Streamline in Arizona alone was estimated as $120 million for court proceedings and $50 million for detention and incarceration.

=== Bundling and rapid processing of cases ===
Another distinguishing feature of Operation Streamline is that cases are not heard individually, but rather in large groups, with many people caught crossing the border together generally being processed in one case. According to a New York Times report, a single court case in Tucson, Arizona can have up to 70 defendants, the upper limit being set by the physical capacity of the court. The time taken to decide the cases varies between 30 minutes (or 25 seconds per defendant) and 2 hours 35 minutes (or a little over 2 minutes per defendant).

=== Relationship with expedited removal ===
Expedited removal is a removal procedure where a person who has recently entered the United States without authorization and does not qualify for some particular exemptions may be removed without going through formal removal proceedings. A person who is sentenced through Operation Streamline may be subject to expedited removal after completing his or her prison term.

Expedited removal may apply not just to people caught by United States Border Patrol in the act of border-crossing but also people who have recently crossed a border and are living in the United States. Also, although expedited removal may be applied after criminal prosecution through Operation Streamline, it is itself an administrative procedure and does not involve the criminal justice system.

In terms of historical timeline, the rollout of Operation Streamline started at around the time that the rollout of expedited removal was being completed. Expedited removal was expanded to all border sectors by September 2005 and the entire border zone by March 2006, whereas Operation Streamline launched in December 2005.

=== Relationship with reinstatement of removal ===
Reinstatement of removal is a removal procedure where a person who had a previous order of removal and subsequently departed the United States, and then re-entered without authorization, may be removed by "reinstating" the previous order. Like expedited removal, it is an administrative procedure that does not involve the criminal justice system. Like expedited removal, it may be applied to a person making a repeat unauthorized entry after the person has gone through the Operation Streamline court process.

=== Relationship with credible fear ===
In principle, a person being subject to criminal prosecution via Operation Streamline should have the opportunity to request asylum and get scheduled for a credible fear interview. However, due to the rapid processing of these cases, many people do not get this opportunity, and may have to serve their prison term despite being eligible for asylum. After the prison term is completed and they are being processed for expedited removal, they are asked if they would like to request asylum and, if so, are scheduled for the credible fear interview.

== History ==
=== Initial launch in Del Rio (December 2005) ===
An initial version of Operation Streamline was proposed by the United States Border Patrol for Del Rio, Texas in response to a significant increase in the number of apprehended non-Mexican migrants, from 10,000 in 2004 to 15,000 in 2005. The U.S. Attorney's Office for the Western District of Texas requested a change to the proposal: in order to avoid running afoul of equal protection, the courts would need to criminally prosecute all migrants, not just those from Mexico. Note that many other related programs, such as the expedited removal procedure, do treat people differently based on nationality: those from Mexico or Canada without a criminal record are not subject to expedited removal, whereas people from other countries may be subject to expedited removal despite the absence of a criminal record. However, the provisions of these programs do not run afoul of equal protection because they are not administered through the criminal justice system.

After approval from then Department of Homeland Security Secretary Michael Chertoff, Operation Streamline became active starting December 2005: all unauthorized border-crossers in the Eagle Pass area of the Del Rio sector would be prosecuted criminally for unlawful entry and re-entry.

=== Rollout to other border sectors ===
Operation Streamline was gradually rolled out in other parts of the United States border:

- Yuma, Arizona in December 2006
- Laredo, Texas in November 2007
- Tucson, Arizona in January 2008
- McAllen, Texas and Brownsville, Texas (the Rio Grande Valley sectors) in June 2008

By 2010, every US-Mexico border sector not in California had implemented Operation Streamline.

=== Legal challenge ===
In December, 2009, it was decided in United States v. Roblero-Solis that en masse judicial proceedings like those in Operation Streamline violated Rule 11 in the Federal Rules of Criminal Procedure. Rule 11 states that the court must determine that a guilty plea is voluntarily made by addressing the defendant personally in court. The Roblero-Solis case determined that “personally” means that the judge must address the defendant in a person-to-person manner.

=== Protests ===
Starting February 2013, Operation Streamline has been protested by activists in Arizona and Texas, the two main states where it is operational.

=== Senate Resolution by Jeff Flake and John McCain ===
United States Senators Jeff Flake and John McCain introduced a Senate Resolution in March 2015 in the 114th United States Congress calling on the Obama administration to immediately remove any directives or policies that would bar the prosecutions of first-time border crossers under this program. The resolution was co-sponsored by Senators Chuck Grassley and Ron Johnson.

== Reception ==
=== Primary aspects of criticism ===
Operation Streamline has received significant criticism from groups concerned about immigrant rights, civil rights, due process, and human rights. Some of the chief angles of criticism have been:

- Operation Streamline inappropriately treats violation of immigration laws as a criminal matter rather than an administrative matter, making it inconsistent with the rest of the immigration system.
- Referring asylum seekers for criminal prosecution via Operation Streamline violates U.S. obligations under Article 31(1) of the Refugee Convention.
- The rapid processing of cases in Operation Streamline goes against the spirit of due process. In many cases, individuals who are United States citizens or permanent residents, have legitimate claims to asylum, or have other valid reasons to be legally present in the United States do not get an opportunity to present their case.
- This lack of due process has a high impact on those who have a legitimate claim to asylum but undergo expedited removal, as the subsequent bar from re-entering the U.S. for five years also bars them from requesting asylum if they re-enter.
- Operation Streamline uses a lot of taxpayer resources, many of which go into funding private prison firms, without making a clear contribution to solving the problem (of reducing unauthorized border-crossing) that it was intended to solve.
- Operation Streamline uses significant resources of the Border Patrol, the federal prison system, and the courts, thereby leaving fewer resources to combat drug trafficking and border violence.

=== Defenses of the program ===
The United States Border Patrol and other branches of the US government have defended the program as a key component of a deterrent strategy that they believe has reduced overall rates of unauthorized border-crossing. Mark Krikorian of the Center for Immigration Studies, a think tank that advocates reduced levels of immigration to the United States (both legal and illegal), also defended the program's necessity and importance in comments to Christian Science Monitor. Legislators Jeff Flake and John McCain, who have proposed the continuation and expansion of the program, have defended its importance in maintaining the national security of the United States.

=== Judicial criticism ===
Judge Robert Brack, who has presided over a large number of Operation Streamline court cases in Las Cruces, New Mexico, has expressed dissatisfaction over the system of laws he is required to enforce with Operation Streamline. He proposed to the Wall Street Journal a "Judge Brack exception" where anybody separated from their family after being sentenced by him should be allowed back in and legalized.

== See also ==
- Expedited removal is a fast-track removal process where somebody who is present in the United States without authorization and arrived legally may be deported without formal removal proceedings. It applies to people who are already in the United States in addition to those caught at a border or denied entry at a designated port of entry. However, it does not involve any criminal charges against the person being removed. Also, it is not applied to people from Mexico or Canada unless they have a criminal history.
- Reinstatement of removal is a fast-track removal process where somebody who re-entered after having left the United States after a past order of removal is removed again by "reinstating" the previous order. This too is a purely administrative procedure and does not involve criminal charges.
- Credible fear: Anybody who expresses a fear of persecution or torture, or requests asylum, at any stage of the removal process, may appear for a credible fear interview where the interviewing officer attempts to assess whether the person's fear is credible. If so, the person cannot be subject to expedited removal and must go through formal removal proceedings.
- Secure Border Initiative
- Catch and release (U.S. immigration policy), a protocol historically followed by immigration enforcement agencies in the United States where people caught for being in unlawful immigration status are released while they wait for a hearing with an immigration judge.
- Trump administration family separation policy
