= Expedited removal =

US immigration enforcement process

Expedited removal is an immigration and nationality law process of the United States where an alien is denied admission to and/or removed from the country, without a hearing before an immigration judge, as provided pursuant to section 235 of the Immigration and Nationality Act of 1952 (8 U.S.C. § 1225). The expedited removal process can be applied to an alien who has been present for less than two years, who has not been admitted or paroled, who is inadmissible, and who is neither Cuban nor has indicated an intention to apply for asylum or a fear of persecution. The expedited removal process was enacted as part of the Illegal Immigration Reform and Immigrant Responsibility Act of 1996, passed by the 104th Congress and signed into law by President Bill Clinton.

Over time, the scope of application has been expanded and contracted at the discretion of the Secretary of Homeland Security, and as of 2025, is being applied at the maximum extent provided by law. Prior to 2025, the scope of expedited removal was limited to aliens who were encountered within 100-miles of a border of the United States and had been present for less than two weeks. Federal law exempts unaccompanied children from expedited removal.

== History ==
=== Legal authority given by IIRIRA (passed 1996, effective 1997) ===
Expedited removal was first introduced in United States immigration law as part of the IIRIRA, passed by the 104th U.S. Congress and signed into law by then U.S. President Bill Clinton.

The IIRIRA gave the U.S. Immigration and Naturalization Service (the name for the umbrella organization responsible for immigration enforcement at the time) the authority to remove from the United States, without the need for a hearing before an immigration judge, people who:

1. are either applicants for admission to the United States or satisfy the following conditions: have entered the United States without admission or advance parole, and have been continuously physically present in the United States for less than two years,
2. are inadmissible under certain statutory grounds primarily due to failure to comply with visa or other entry document requirements, and/or fraud or misrepresentation,
3. make no claim to lawful permanent resident status, and
4. do not seek asylum or express a fear of persecution.

=== Initial implementation at ports of entry (1997) ===
Starting April 1997, when the IIRIRA came into force, the INS implemented expedited removal only against noncitizens seeking admission at designated ports of entry (such as airports and sea ports).

=== Expansion to arrivals by sea and formalization of credible fear screening (2002) ===
In November 2002, the INS expanded the application of expedited removal to people satisfying these three conditions:

1. entered the U.S. by sea, either by boat or other means,
2. were not admitted or paroled into the U.S.
3. have not been continuously present in the U.S. for at least two years.

Given that expedited removal now included people who were already present in the United States, and therefore might affect people eligible for asylum, the INS also introduced a credible fear screening process for those who indicated that they might be eligible for asylum.

=== Expansion to a 100-mile border zone and all people within 14 days of arrival (2004) ===
In 2004, the United States Department of Homeland Security published an immediately effective notice in the Federal Register expanding the application of expedited removal to aliens who are encountered within 100 miles of any land or sea border and who entered the U.S. without inspection less than 14 days before the time they are encountered. U.S. Customs and Border Protection could therefore identify possible immigration violators anywhere in this 100-mile border zone and process them for expedited removal if they had been in the country for less than 14 days.

The notice clarified that, as a matter of prosecutorial discretion, the DHS would apply the expansions only to:

1. third-country nationals (not from Mexico or Canada)
2. Mexican or Canadian nationals with histories of criminal or immigration violations, such as smugglers or aliens who have made numerous illegal entries.

It also indicated that officers could exercise discretion not to commence expedited removal proceedings based on individual equities.

=== Rollout of expansion to border zone ===
Due to resource constraints, the expansion of expedited removal to the entire border zone did not happen immediately. The implementation was done in three phases:

1. Initially, the DHS implemented expedited removal against aliens in the Tucson (Arizona), McAllen (Texas), and Laredo (Texas) Border Patrol Sectors.
2. In September 2005, expedited removal was expanded to all nine Border Patrol Sectors along the southwest border.
3. In March 2006, it was announced that expedited removal had been implemented in the entire border zone.

Expedited removal was used about 188,000 times by the Obama Administration in FY2014.

=== National applicability, rollback, and re-expansion ===
In July 2019, the Department of Homeland Security under the Trump Administration expanded the scope of expedited removal to include aliens anywhere in the United States for less than two years. The District of Columbia chapter of the American Civil Liberties Union and American Immigration Council challenged this notice in the federal case Make the Road New York v. McAleenan, preventing its use until a temporary injunction was lifted by the Appeals Court for the D.C. Circuit in June 2020. The case was dismissed when the Biden Administration reversed the 2019 Trump expansion in March 2023. Another ACLU lawsuit challenged the Illegal Immigration Reform and Immigrant Responsibility Act of 1996 on the grounds that its limitation of habeas corpus judicial review violates the Suspension Clause of Article One of the U.S. Constitution. The United States Supreme Court upheld the law in its 2020 decision Department of Homeland Security v. Thuraissigiam.

In FY2019, the Trump Administration performed about 163,000 expedited removals, but due to lawsuits over the expansion, only 17 were from the interior of the country. From early 2020 to mid-2023, the COVID-19 pandemic saw hundreds of thousands of removals under public health emergency Title 42 expulsion powers. Expedited removal was used about 193,000 times in FY2024 to deport migrants from the border region for less than two weeks.

At the beginning of the second Trump Administration, in response to Executive Order 14159, the Department of Homeland Security reinstated the 2019 expansion. The ACLU quickly filed another lawsuit, Make the Road New York v. Benjamine Huffman, arguing that the DHS notice violated the Due Process Clause in the Fifth Amendment to the United States Constitution, the Immigration and Nationality Act of 1965, and the Administrative Procedure Act. In March 2025, the case CHIRLA v. Noem was brought to challenge the use of expedited removal for people previously on humanitarian parole who were about to become eligible for removal due to blanket revocation of parole under Executive Order 14165.

== Exceptions and government discretion ==
A number of de facto and de jure exceptions apply to expedited removal.

=== Asylum seekers ===
Those who request to apply for asylum, or express a fear of persecution or torture when they make contact with immigration enforcement, are referred for a credible fear interview with a United States Citizenship and Immigration Services officer. If they are able to demonstrate to the officer that they have a credible fear of persecution or torture, they may no longer be subject to expedited removal, but go through a regular immigration hearing before a judge. If they fail to convince the USCIS officer that they have a credible fear of persecution or torture, they may be subject to expedited removal.

=== Cuban nationals ===
Prior to President Obama's re-formalization of diplomatic relations with Cuba, the United States followed a "wet feet, dry feet policy". Cubans already present in the United States were eligible to stay, and weren't subject to expedited removal proceedings. However, those who arrived at a designated port of entry could be subject to expedited removal.

As part of the re-normalization of diplomatic relations, on January 12, 2017, the Secretary of the Department of Homeland Security Jeh Johnson announced the following change:

"Beginning today, DHS has rescinded certain policies unique to Cuban nationals. Specifically, DHS has eliminated a special parole policy for arriving Cuban nationals commonly known as the 'wet-foot/dry-foot' policy, as well as a policy for Cuban medical professionals known as the Cuban Medical Professional Parole Program. It is now Department policy to consider any requests for such parole in the same manner as parole requests filed by nationals of other countries."

"DHS is also eliminating an exemption that previously prevented the use of expedited removal proceedings for Cuban nationals apprehended at ports of entry or near the border. The existing Cuban Family Reunification Parole Program is not affected by this announcement and remains in effect."

=== Status claimants ===
Anybody who states under oath to a border agent that they are a citizen, lawful permanent resident, or asylee cannot be subject to expedited removal and gets an opportunity to appear before an immigration judge. Lying about one's status in these circumstances may make one inadmissible and could even lead to a lifetime bar to U.S. admission.

=== Voluntary return ===
The officer at a designated port of entry may discretionarily give people being turned back the option of "voluntary return" as an alternative to expedited removal. A voluntary return also goes on the person's immigration record, but has fewer serious legal consequences for attempted future entry than an order of removal.

== Procedure ==
=== Order of expedited removal ===
After an immigration enforcement official (working for U.S. Customs and Border Protection) comes in contact with the person believed to be eligible for expedited removal, the official asks the person if they want to apply for asylum or fear persecution or torture if returned to their home country.

- If the person answers affirmatively, they are issued a Form M-444 Information About Credible Fear Interview and referred for a credible fear interview with a United States Citizenship and Immigration Service official.
- If the person answers negatively, or after the person answers positively but receives an unfavorable determination in the credible fear interview, the person is issued Form I-860 Notice and Order of Expedited Removal.
- The person may now be physically removed from the United States.

=== Contesting an expedited removal order ===
An expedited removal order cannot be appealed. However, it is possible to submit a challenge to the order to the U.S. Customs and Border Protection to reconsider an expedited removal order. The challenge should be filed within 30 days of the decision. Based on the information and evidence provided, the CBP may exercise its discretion and overturn its prior expedited removal order. If an expedited removal order was issued at a designated port of entry such as an airport, the affected party may also file a complaint with the DHS's Traveler Redress Inquiry Program.

== Effects on future admissibility to the United States ==
As far as the effects on future admissibility to the United States, expedited removal is treated similarly to ordinary removal. For first-time offenders who have not committed an aggravated felony and did not lie under oath, the typical ban length is five years. However, the ban could be a five-year, ten-year, twenty-year, or permanent ban based on the circumstances.

== Related procedures ==
A "Just Facts" summary by the Immigration Policy Center identified a few other summary removal practices similar to expedited removal:

- Reinstatement of removal: This applies to noncitizens who return illegally to the United States after having previously been deported. Essentially, DHS "reinstates" the original removal order without considering the individual's current situation, reasons for returning to the United States, or the presence of flaws in the original removal proceedings.
- Stipulated removal: Here, the person is formally charged and placed in immigration court proceedings before an immigration judge. However, the person does not actually appear before the judge, but rather agrees (or "stipulates") to deportation and gives up their right to a hearing. The immigration judge may enter the order of removal without seeing the person and asking them whether the stipulation was entered into knowingly and voluntarily.

Other procedures related to expedited removal include:

- Operation Streamline: This is a program where those caught crossing borders without authorization are subject to federal criminal charges.
- Administrative removal for aggravated felons: This is a process where those convicted of an aggravated felony may be removed immediately after finishing their prison term without going through removal proceedings.

== Reception ==
=== Criticism from civil rights, constitutional rights, and immigrant rights perspectives ===
A number of immigrant rights advocates have expressed concern about the lack of due process involved with expedited removal, both at designated ports of entry and for people in the border zone.

The National Immigration Law Center expressed concern about the expansion of expedited removal to the entire border zone considering that the concerns expressed by the United States Commission on International Religious Freedom regarding protections for asylum-seekers had not been adequately addressed. Similarly, the American Civil Liberties Union has argued that expedited removal can lead to many people who would qualify for asylum getting deported. The Immigration Policy Center noted that expedited removal proceedings and other rapid deportation decisions "often fail to take into account many critical factors, including whether the individual is eligible to apply for lawful status in the United States, whether he or she has long-standing ties here, or whether he or she has U.S.-citizen family members."

The American Civil Liberties Union has noted that the 100-mile "border zone" within which expedited removal can be carried out houses roughly 2/3 of the United States population, and has expressed concern about the implications of these broad enforcement powers for civil rights and constitutional protections.

=== Support from groups concerned with combating illegal immigration ===
The Center for Immigration Studies, a group that advocates reduced immigration to the United States (both legal and illegal), has noted that expedited removal, as authorized by the IIRIRA, gave the executive branch sufficient power to deport a large fraction of illegal immigrants, but that the executive branch had been exceedingly cautious with its application.

== See also ==
- Credible fear
- Catch and release (U.S. immigration policy)
- Reinstatement of removal
- Stipulated removal
- Operation Streamline
- Withdrawal of application for admission
- Voluntary departure (United States)
