= Vernon K. Krieble Foundation =

American private foundation

- Founded: 1984
- Founder: Helen E. Krieble
- Type: private foundation
- Key people: Helen E. Krieble
- Website: https://krieblefoundation.org/

The Vernon K. Krieble Foundation is a private foundation based in the United States. The Krieble Foundation was started by Helen E. Krieble, daughter of Robert H. Krieble, who created the Loctite Corporation (the company that developed the first practical superglue technology). Established in 1984, the foundation's aim is "to further democratic capitalism and preserve and promote a society of free, educated, healthy and creative individuals."

== Red Card Solution ==
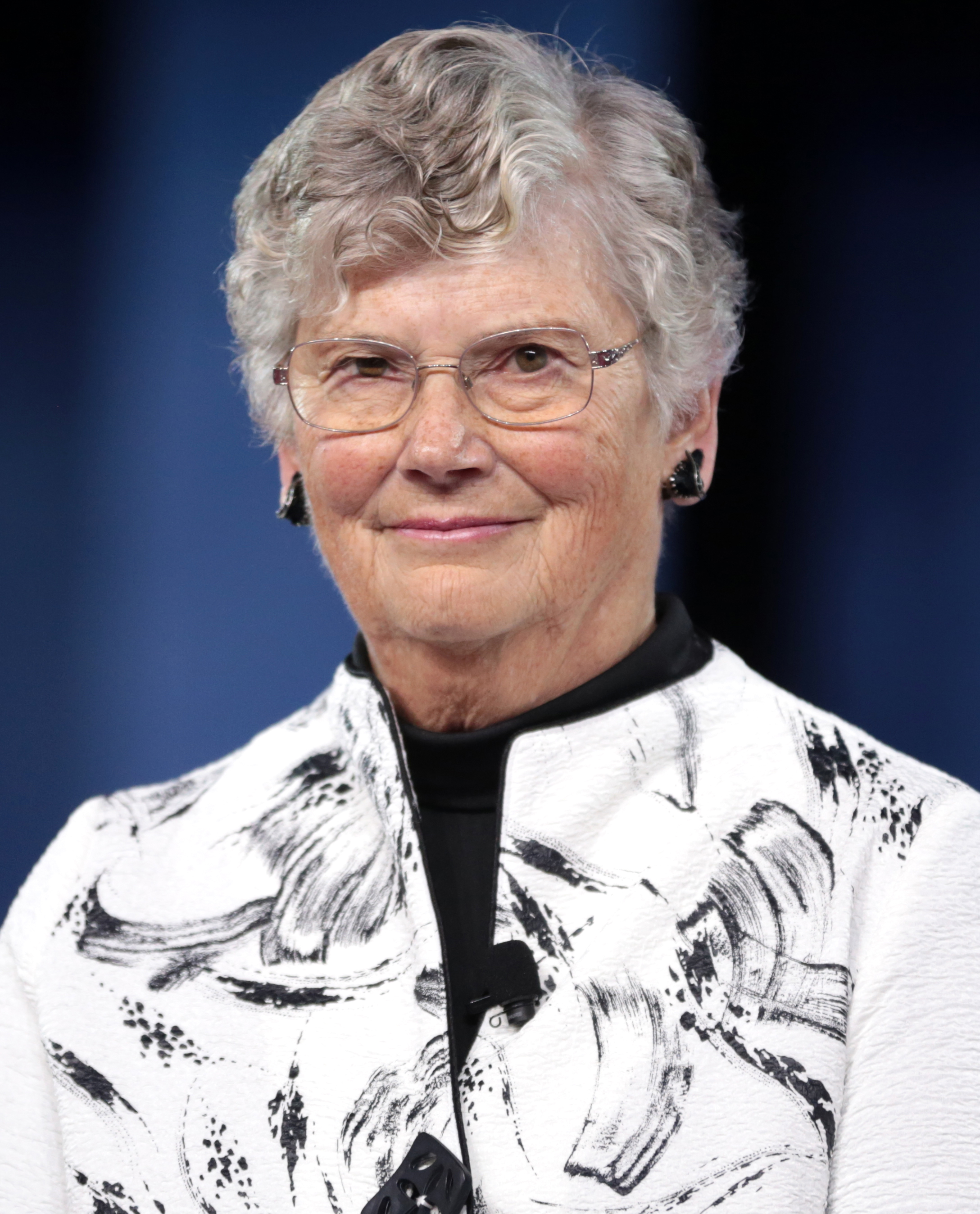
Helen Krieble.

The Krieble Foundation's main policy focus is immigration reform for the United States. Specifically, they have proposed a "Red Card Solution" that allows for an uncapped guest worker program in the United States.

=== Reception after endorsement by Newt Gingrich ===
The Red Card Solution was endorsed by Republican presidential primary candidate Newt Gingrich in November 2011 in the run-up to the 2012 Republican presidential primaries. The proposal was applauded by some libertarian proponents of freer migration, such as Alex Nowrasteh, and also by Jessica Zuckerman in an article for The Heritage Foundation, a conservative think tank. However, it also met with opposition from groups on both sides of the political spectrum, including the generally pro-immigration Immigration Policy Center and generally anti-immigration groups such as NumbersUSA and the "low-immigration, pro-immigrant" Center for Immigration Studies. Reihan Salam offered a mixed review on the National Review website, writing: "What should be clear is that the Red Card proposal represents a radical departure from the immigration status quo, for better or for worse. Kudos to Newt Gingrich for advancing a distinctive, unconventional proposal." Suzy Khimm reviewed the proposal for the Washington Post.

=== 2013 Discussions ===
Discussion of the Red Card Solution revived somewhat in 2013, with an article by Helen Krieble advocating it in The Guardian in February 2013, and Ruben Navarrette endorsing it in April 2013.

== Other activities ==
The Krieble Foundation donated money to an anti-tax event in the United Kingdom organized by the UK's Taxpayers' Alliance.
