= National Immigrant Justice Center =

Immigrant rights organization

The National Immigrant Justice Center (NIJC) is a center affiliated with the Heartland Alliance in the United States that "is dedicated to ensuring human rights protections and access to justice for all immigrants, refugees and asylum seekers." Its executive director is Mary Meg McCarthy and it is headquartered in Chicago.

== Programs ==
NIJC has a number of programs dedicated to helping immigrants and affording them legal representation and protection:

- Jeanne and Joseph Sullivan Program for Protection of Asylum Seekers: This is a network of approximately 1000 pro bono lawyers who seek to defend asylum rights.
- Defenders Initiative: This initiative seeks to provide information to defenders in criminal cases at the federal, state, and local level so that they can provide better advice to their clients on the potential immigration consequences of being convicted of crimes.
- Gender Justice Initiative: This upholds the rights of immigrant women, and helps those who are victims of domestic violence and crime.
- Detention, Democracy and Due Process Project: This aims to uphold the due process rights of immigrants held in detention or subject to deportation.
- Immigrant Children's Protection Project: This aims to protect the rights of detained and non-detained immigrant children who may be subject to deportation.
- Immigrant Legal Defense Project: This offers free and low-cost legal representation and related services to immigrant families in need.
- Counter-Trafficking Project: Provides comprehensive legal services and case management for children and adult survivors of human trafficking.
- LGBT Immigrant Rights Initiative: Defends equal protections for LGBT immigrants.

== External coverage ==
=== Media coverage ===
NIJC's work has been cited in articles about immigration, immigrant detention, and refugees in the New York Times the Wall Street Journal, The Guardian, and numerous other publications. Letters from the editor by NIJC's executive director have been published by the NYT and WSJ.

== See also ==
- American Immigration Lawyers Association
- Federation for American Immigration Reform
- Immigration Policy Center
- National Immigration Law Center
