= Advocates for Immigrant Rights and Reconciliation =

American non-profit organization

- Abbreviation: AIRR
- Formation: 2016; 10 years ago
- Type: 501(c)(3) non-profit organization
- Purpose: Immigrant rights advocacy
- Headquarters: Kansas City metropolitan area
- Location: Kansas, Missouri
- Key people: Karla Juarez (Executive Director)
- Revenue: US$183,000 (2023)
- Expenses: $157,000 (2023)
- Website: airrkc.org

Advocates for Immigrant Rights and Reconciliation (AIRR) is an American non-profit organization for immigrant rights in Kansas and Missouri. It was founded in 2016 in the Kansas City metropolitan area, where its work includes legislative advocacy, community organizing, and direct-support programs.

AIRR was a leader in the coalition that secured the passage of the 2022 Safe and Welcoming Wyandotte Act, a Kansas City, Kansas, ordinance that created a municipal ID program and limited local cooperation with federal immigration authorities. The organization gained further public prominence for its role as the primary community and media liaison during the July 2025 federal immigration raids at two area restaurants.

== History ==
Advocates for Immigrant Rights and Reconciliation was established in 2016, gaining 501(c)(3) tax-exempt status in April of that year. Its stated mission is to "organize and activate immigrants in Kansas and Missouri to advocate for their rights and well-being". Early work focused on foundational services, including "Know Your Rights" workshops to educate community members on constitutional protections during encounters with law enforcement. In 2022, this program had 1,151 participants.

The organization's most significant legislative campaign began in 2017 to create the Safe and Welcoming Wyandotte Act. The effort was conducted in coalition with the American Civil Liberties Union of Kansas and El Centro, Inc., but stalled for several years under a mayoral administration that did not support the ordinance. The campaign involved persistent community organizing, including canvassing neighborhoods and outreach to local businesses. A critical turning point came with the 2021 election of Mayor Tyrone Garner, who had endorsed the ordinance and prioritized its consideration. The Unified Government of Wyandotte County and Kansas City, Kansas, passed the act on February 10, 2022, by a 6–4 vote. The act created a municipal ID card for all residents, addressing an issue for what proponents estimated was the twenty percent of county residents who lacked photo ID.It also codified a policy limiting the use of local resources for federal immigration enforcement unless compelled by a judicial warrant. The passage prompted a direct political backlash from Kansas Attorney General Derek Schmidt, who cited the ordinance as the primary impetus for introducing state-level legislation to ban such "sanctuary city" policies.

In 2020, Karla Juarez, an immigrant from Mexico with a degree in political science, became executive director. Following her appointment, the organization increased its public and political advocacy. AIRR's finances grew significantly in the wake of its legislative success; after several years of revenues typically under $115,000, its total revenue more than doubled in 2022 to $265,000.

AIRR is active in the state legislatures of both Kansas and Missouri. As part of the Missouri Immigration Policy Coalition, it has advocated for legislation to grant in-state tuition to non-citizen Missouri high school graduates. In January 2025, Juarez testified before a Missouri Senate committee against bills designed to increase local law enforcement's role in federal immigration enforcement. In Kansas, AIRR and the ACLU of Kansas jointly petitioned in 2025 against a proposal by the private prison company CoreCivic to operate a U.S. Immigration and Customs Enforcement (ICE) detention facility in Leavenworth, Kansas. It has also petitioned Wyandotte County for Spanish-language election materials.

On July 30, 2025, agents from Homeland Security Investigations (HSI) conducted immigration raids at two El Toro Loco restaurants in Kansas City, Kansas, and Lenexa, Kansas. AIRR assumed a central public role in the aftermath, becoming the first to report the raids and the number of workers detained to the media.

== Partnerships ==
AIRR frequently collaborates with other organizations such as the American Civil Liberties Union of Kansas on campaigns like the Safe and Welcoming Wyandotte Act and the opposition to the Leavenworth detention center. It is a member of the Missouri Immigration Policy Coalition.

== See also ==
- John Brown (abolitionist), another nationwide activist leader of immigrant and human rights in Kansas
- Quindaro Townsite, the KC metro's underground railroad for refugees from slavery into the free state of Kansas
- Immigration detention in the United States
- American Immigration Council
- National Immigration Law Center
- Refugee and Immigrant Center for Education and Legal Services (RAICES)
- Right of asylum
