= Marielena Hincapié =

Colombian-American lawyer

Marielena Hincapié is a Colombian-American lawyer who works for immigration rights and is the executive director of the National Immigration Law Center. She moved to the United States from Colombia at the age of three and received her law degree from the Northeastern University School of Law. A strong critic of what she considered to be weak policies from the Obama administration, she was appointed to co-chair the Biden-Sanders Unity Task Force on Immigration.
