= Loctite =

American brand of adhesives and chemicals

Loctite Corporation
- Product type: Adhesives; Superglues; Epoxies; Spray adhesives; Construction adhesives; Threadlockers
- Current owner: Henkel AG & Co. KGaA
- Country: Rocky Hill, Connecticut, U.S.
- Introduced: July 26, 1956; 70 years ago
- Markets: Worldwide
- Website: loctite.com

Loctite is an American brand of adhesives, sealants, surface treatments, and other industrial chemicals that include acrylic, anaerobic, cyanoacrylate, epoxy, hot melt, silicone, urethane, and UV/light curing technologies. Loctite products are sold globally and are used in a variety of industrial and hobbyist applications.

== History ==
In 1953, American professor Vernon K. Krieble developed anaerobic threadlocking adhesives in his basement laboratory at Trinity College in Hartford, Connecticut. Krieble's company, American Sealants, founded the Loctite brand, which was promoted as ushering in a new era of mechanical reliability by eliminating the vibrational loosening of mechanical fasteners, a frequent cause of machine failure. In 1956, the name Loctite was chosen by Krieble's daughter-in-law, Nancy Brayton Krieble. The Loctite sealant made its official public debut at a press conference at the University Club of New York on July 26 of that year.

In 1963, American Sealants changed its name to the Loctite Corporation. After Vernon Krieble's death in 1964, his son Robert H. Krieble, also a chemist, was chief executive until 1985. The Vernon K. Krieble Foundation was established in 1984 in honor of the co-founder.

In 1964, Loctite introduced cyanoacrylate adhesives (a repackaged Eastman product, developed at Tennessee Eastman/Eastman Chemical in 1942, and originally marketed as "Eastman 910"), later known as "Super Glue". It was the first of many new products, including silicones, epoxies, acrylics, and the development of new Loctite anaerobics. The 1980s brought about the addition of a line of micro anaerobic adhesives.

In 1997, Loctite was acquired as a flagship brand by Henkel, a German Fortune 500 company. Since then, Loctite has remained a primary Henkel brand.

== Products ==
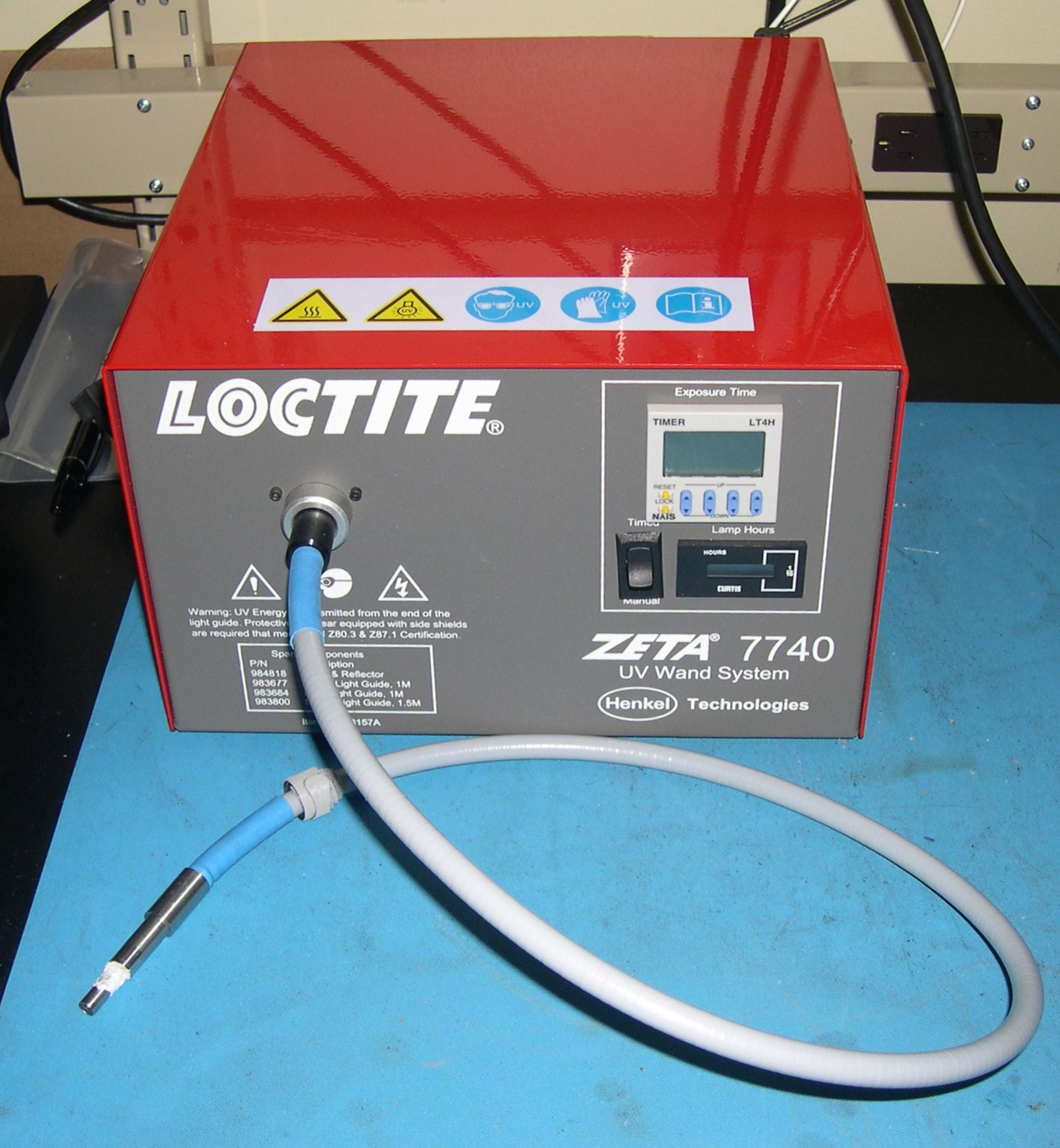
Loctite branded UV curing wand

Products made with Loctite branding include:

- Bonding adhesives, such as cyanoacrylates, epoxies, and hot melts
- Protective coatings for industrial equipment
- Flooring and concrete repair sealants and topcoats
- Gasketing and sealing products
- Industrial anti-seize and lubricating products
- Machining compounds that supplement cutting, smoothing, and finishing processes
- Potting and encapsulating products to reinforce housed assemblies
- Repairing, rebuilding, and restoring
- Retaining compounds for non-threaded cylindrical assemblies
- Surface preparation products such as cleaners and degreasers
- Threadlockers and thread sealants in anaerobic liquid and semi-solid formulations
- Medical applications (adhesives, dispensing equipment, curing systems)
- Adhesive equipment (controllers, reservoirs, applicators, valves, dispensing systems, pumps, monitoring systems).
- Solder pastes

== Sponsorships ==
Loctite was a technical partnership for McLaren since the beginning of the Mercedes partnership in 1995 to 2003, until the brand itself was owned by Henkel and switching it in 2004 and extended to 2007. They also sponsored the original Team Lotus in 1993 and 1994.

Loctite was a primary sponsor for both Mugen and Nismo teams in Japan Grand Touring Car Championship in GT500 class between 2000 and 2001.
