= Refugee and Immigrant Center for Education and Legal Services =

American nonprofit organization aiming to provide legal services to immigrants

RAICES
- Founded: October 6, 1986; 40 years ago
- Tax ID no.: 74-2436920
- Legal status: 501(c)(3) Non-profit organization
- Headquarters: San Antonio, Texas
- Location(s): P.O. Box 786100; San Antonio, Texas, 78278, United States
- Services: Immigration, legal and social services
- Co-CEO: Anna L. Flores, MBA
- Co-CEO: Faisal Al-Juburi
- Employees: 320
- Website: www.raicestexas.org

RAICES, a 501(c)(3) non-profit organization formally known as the Refugee and Immigrant Center for Education and Legal Services, promotes what they describe as "migrant justice" by providing legal services, social services case management, and rights advocacy for immigrant, refugee, and asylum-seeking people and families. It is headquartered in Texas, United States, and operates nationwide.

As of 2018, RAICES was said to be the largest immigration legal services agency in Texas.

== History ==
RAICES was founded in 1986 during the Sanctuary Movement as a response to immigration policies that created impossible legal barriers for Central American refugees to seek protection in the US.

In June 2018, publicity regarding the Trump administration's family separation policy led to the creation of an Internet campaign to collect funds for RAICES.

A Facebook user in California created a fundraiser for RAICES called "Reunite an immigrant parent with their child." Raising over $20 million, the fundraiser was created in response to a "zero tolerance" immigration policy implemented in April 2018 by United States Attorney General Jeff Sessions, which requires United States Border Patrol agents to detain for criminal prosecution all adult immigrants suspected of crossing the border illegally, which often requires separating children from their incarcerated parent(s).

In 2018, RAICES refused a $250,000 donation from the company Salesforce unless the company ended all contracts with the US Customs and Border Protection. Salesforce declined to end their relationship with US Customs, and issued a statement saying the company did not support separating migrant families. Salesforce offered to donate $1 million to help families who were separated.

== See also ==
- Immigration detention in the United States
- Advocates for Immigrant Rights and Reconciliation
- American Immigration Council
- National Immigration Law Center
- Right of asylum
