= Cancellation of removal =

Term in United States immigration law

Cancellation of removal is a provision of the Immigration and Nationality Act (INA) of the United States that allows some aliens who are in removal proceedings, who have lived in the United States for a long period of time and meet certain other conditions, to apply to remain in the United States and have the removal proceedings terminated. Cancellation of removal was crafted by the U.S. Congress to replace "suspension of deportation," a similar form of relief available prior to April 1, 1997.

Cancellation of removal is potentially available to aliens. A non-Lawful permanent resident (LPR) who is granted cancellation of removal becomes an LPR.

== Background ==
Prior to April 1, 1997, the effective date of IIRIRA, a legal remedy known as "suspension of deportation" was available to aliens in deportation proceedings. Although functionally similar to cancellation of removal, suspension of deportation did not distinguish between "permanent residents" of the United States and "nonpermanent residents." To obtain suspension of deportation, an applicant under the pre-IIRIRA standard was required to fulfill the following: (1) continuous physical presence in the United States for a period of at least seven years; (2) "good moral character" during that entire period; and (3) that the applicant's deportation from the United States would result in "extreme hardship" to the applicant or any qualifying relative, which was mainly the applicant's spouse, parents, or children, who were either citizens or LPRs of the United States. After these three requirements were met, the LPR was granted relief irrespective of his or her age, health, race, color, religion, nationality, political affiliation, political opinion, etc.

== Legal standard ==
=== Lawful permanent residents of the United States ===
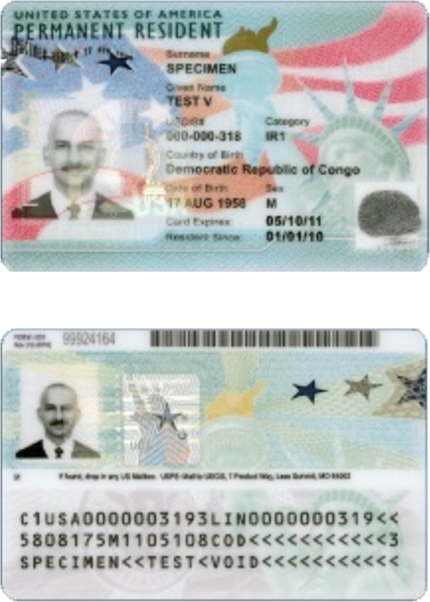
Sample of a permanent resident card (green card), which lawfully permits its holder to live and work in the United States similar to that of all other Americans. Before any legal immigrant is naturalized as a U.S. citizen, he or she must be a green card holder for at least 5 years and satisfy all other U.S. citizenship requirements.

The INA states the following:

The Attorney General may cancel removal in the case of an alien who is inadmissible or deportable . . . if the alien—(1) has been an alien lawfully admitted for permanent residence for not less than 5 years, (2) has resided in the United States continuously for 7 years after having been admitted in any status, and (3) has not been convicted of any aggravated felony.

According to the BIA, "cancellation of removal is both discretionary and prospective in nature."

=== Nonpermanent residents ===
Regarding a nonpermanent resident, the Attorney General is expected to cancel the removal proceedings (and adjust the status of such alien to that of an LPR) if the alien:

(A) has been physically present in the United States for a continuous period of not less than 10 years immediately preceding the date of such application; (B) has been a person of good moral character during such period; (C) has not been convicted of an offense under section 1182(a)(2), 1227(a)(2), or 1227(a)(3) of this title, subject to paragraph (5); and (D) establishes that removal would result in exceptional and extremely unusual hardship to the alien's spouse, parent, or child, who is a citizen of the United States or an alien lawfully admitted for permanent residence.

== See also ==
- Deportation of Americans from the United States
- Impediment to expulsion
- Waiver of inadmissibility
- Stateless
