= Stipulated removal =

Summary deportation from the US

Stipulated removal is a summary deportation procedure used in immigration enforcement in the United States. Stipulated removal occurs when a noncitizen who is facing removal proceedings and is scheduled for a hearing with an immigration judge signs a document stipulating that he/she is waiving the right to trial and to appeal, and is prepared to be removed immediately. The stipulation of removal must still be signed off by the judge before whom the hearing is to take place, but the noncitizen need not be physically presented to the judge. It is authorized under Section 240(d) of the Immigration and Nationality Act of 1965 According to the United States Code of Federal Regulations: "A stipulated order shall constitute a conclusive determination of the alien’s removability from the United States." Stipulated removal applies only to those who are scheduled for regular removal proceedings, and does not apply to people who are being removed through other summary procedures such as expedited removal, reinstatement of removal, or administrative removal for aggravated felons.

== History ==
Stipulated removal was formally launched in 1995 with the stated goal of alleviating overcrowding in federal, state, and local detention centers. However, it began to be used in a significant way only starting 2004, when George W. Bush, the President of the United States at the time, started ramping up immigration enforcement. Between 1999 and 2003, a total of 6 people were subject to stipulated removal. On the other hand, the number of people subject to stipulated removal increased from 5,491 in 2004 to over 30,000 by 2007. Between 2004 and 2009, the detention facilities at Eloy and Chicago together accounted for over a third of the stipulated removal orders. The total number of stipulated removals exceeded 160,000 as of September 2011, and the majority of individuals targeted for stipulated removal hailed from Mexico.

In September 2010, the 9th United States Circuit Court of Appeals ruled that immigration officials at Eloy had violated the rights of Isaac Ramos, an illegal immigrant from Mexico with prior criminal convictions, in 2006. In response, new guidelines for stipulated removal were issued according to which the noncitizen could sign the stipulated removal order only if he or she had legal representation (legal representation is not provided at taxpayer expense).

In November 2011, it was reported that the use of stipulated removal in Arizona (including the Eloy Detention Center) had stopped after the changes triggered by the Ramos case.

== Related procedures ==
A "Just Facts" summary by the Immigration Policy Center identified a few other summary removal practices similar to stipulated removal:

- Reinstatement of removal: This applies to noncitizens who return illegally to the United States after having previously been deported. Essentially, DHS “reinstates” the original removal order without considering the individual's current situation, reasons for returning to the United States, or the presence of flaws in the original removal proceedings.
- Expedited removal: Here, a person who recently entered the United States without authorization may be deported without going through regular removal proceedings. Expedited removal is applied only to third-country nationals (those not from Mexico or Canada), or those with criminal records.

== Reception ==
=== Concerns about confusion, strong-arming, and lack of due process ===
Law resource NOLO notes that people have a common confusion about stipulated removal, believing that stipulating to be removed improves a person's chances for re-entry, possibly due to the conflation of stipulated removal with voluntary departure. In fact, stipulated removal is treated like any other removal for the purposes of future re-entry.

A review of stipulated removal by the Stanford Law School noted: "The government targets undocumented individuals for stipulated removal while they are in immigration detention, most likely because they cannot afford to post thousands of dollars in bond money to obtain release from detention. If these individuals were able to post bond, they could continue to challenge their removal cases instead of simply accepting deportation. Unfortunately, these individuals also are typically unable to obtain or afford legal representation." Karen Tumlin of the National Immigration Law Center (an immigrant rights advocacy group and support center) told the Los Angeles Times that of the more than dozen detainees she interviewed at the Mira Loma Detention Center in Lancaster, none understood what they had agreed to and what the legal consequences for them would be.

=== Positive reception and defense ===
Immigrations and Customs Enforcement officers have argued that stipulated removal helps both the government and the individuals deported: the government saves on detention costs whereas the individuals involved are freed from confining and highly restrictive detention. They have also argued that the program has adequate safeguards to make sure that people with a legal basis to stay in the United States are not subject to stipulated removal.

Jessica Vaughan of the Center for Immigration Studies, a think tank that advocates reduced immigration to the United States, has argued that the stipulated removal program should be expanded rather than scaled back. She has also been critical of the changes to the program after the Ramos decision, noting that offering stipulated removal only to immigrants who hire their own lawyers bogs down the judicial process and defeats the purpose of the program: to quickly remove illegal immigrants with no legal grounds to remain in the U.S. who want to go home.
