= National Immigration Law Center =

American advocacy group

- Abbreviation: NILC
- Formation: 1979; 47 years ago
- Type: 501(c)(3)
- Headquarters: Los Angeles
- Location(s): Berkeley, California; Washington, DC
- Region served: United States
- Revenue: 17,631,835 USD (2024)
- Expenses: 17,023,582 USD (2024)
- Website: nilc.org

The National Immigration Law Center (NILC) is a center in the United States that "engages in policy analysis, litigation, education and advocacy, to achieve [the] vision" of "a society in which all people—regardless of race, gender, immigration or economic status—are treated fairly and humanely". They claim to concentrate on social, economic, and racial justice for low-income immigrants. They have offices in Washington, D.C. as well as in Los Angeles and Oakland, California. Their executive director is Marielena Hincapié.

== Activities ==
NILC plays a role both in advocacy to influence legislation in a manner that would provide greater justice to immigrants and in spreading awareness and information so that immigrants can better navigate the existing social, political, and legal landscape. Unlike the National Immigrant Justice Center, they do not provide or facilitate direct legal representation to immigrants. Their activities include publishing information on immigration reform legislation, immigration enforcement, workers' rights, education, driver's licenses, taxes, and litigation. Their litigation activities are intended as impact litigation, i.e., they focus on litigation that might have an effect on state laws or on the judicial interpretation of these laws.

== External coverage ==
=== Media coverage ===
The New York Times lists NILC as one of the main advocacy groups related to immigration in the United States, alongside the National Immigration Forum, and American Immigration Lawyers Association. NILC has been cited in discussions of immigration and immigrant legal rights in the New York Times, the Wall Street Journal, Forbes, and The Washington Post.

== See also ==
- Immigration Policy Center
- Advocates for Immigrant Rights and Reconciliation
- Immigration detention in the United States
- American Immigration Council
- Refugee and Immigrant Center for Education and Legal Services (RAICES)
- Right of asylum
