= ImmigrationWorks USA =

American immigration advocacy organization

- Founded: July 18, 2008; 18 years ago
- Tax ID no.: 26-2033929
- Legal status: 501(c)(4) nonprofit organization
- Headquarters: Washington, D.C.
- Corporation: Tamar Jacoby
- Revenue: $122,963 (2016)
- Expenses: $91,290 (2016)
- Employees: 2 (2017)

ImmigrationWorks USA was a national 501(c)(4) nonprofit organization in the United States that advocated for freer movement of workers, representing the interests of businesses who would like to be able to hire migrant workers more freely. It linked 25 state-based coalitions of businesses. The organization also had a sister foundation, ImmigrationWorks Foundation, that was a registered 501(c)(3) charitable organization.

== People ==
Tamar Jacoby, Senior Fellow at the Manhattan Institute and long-time advocate of free movement of labor, was the driving force behind ImmigrationWorks USA.

== Principles ==
Jacoby claimed to advance the following principles through ImmigrationWorks:

- A legal system that works: Bringing the United States' annual legal intake of foreigners in line with the country's labor needs.
- Smarter, better enforcement that would be made easier by the reduced incentives to migrate illegally once labor movement has been liberalized.
- Worksite verification that does not penalize employers for errors in government databases.
- A remedy for past mistakes: Finding a middle ground for dealing with the current unauthorized population that involves neither deportation nor amnesty.
- Protecting U.S. workers by holding legal foreign workers to the same labor standards as domestic workers are held.
- Washington and the states: Immigration policy is a federal responsibility, and must ultimately be resolved at the federal level.

Charity evaluator GiveWell, in its review, stated: "In practice, IW focuses primarily on the first of these bullet points, and its advocacy efforts tend to be oriented towards Republicans."

== Activities ==
ImmigrationWorks worked to facilitate more grassroots lobbying by local businesses, as well as public opinion research and lobbying legislators. On request from charity evaluator GiveWell, ImmigrationWorks prepared a list of things they would do with additional money (that they then received from Good Ventures):

1. Advocacy for immigration reform
2. Public opinion research
3. Building consensus around policy

== External reviews ==
Charity evaluator and effective altruism organization GiveWell reviewed ImmigrationWorks in 2015 as a potential funding opportunity.

== History ==
According to a New York Times article, Tamar Jacoby, a Senior Fellow at the Manhattan Institute, was motivated to create ImmigrationWorks USA after seeing the political difficulties that ensnared the attempted passage of immigration reform in 2006. ImmigrationWorks USA started operations in 2008 so as to help employers make their case for the need for freer movement of workers more effectively to politicians as well as the general public. Their work, including a successful lobbying effort in Arizona, was reported in The New York Times in 2008.

According to ProPublica, ImmigrationWorks USA submitted Internal Revenue Service documentation from 2008 to 2016 as a tax exempt non-profit organization. ProPublica does not list analogous "form 990" information from 2017 or 2018.

== Funding ==
ImmigrationWorks received funding from a number of foundations, including the Carnegie Corporation, Ford Foundation, Four Freedoms Fund, and Open Society Institute. In July 2014, Good Ventures, the private foundation of Facebook co-founder Dustin Moskovitz and his wife Cari Tuna, made an unrestricted grant of $285,000 USD to ImmigrationWorks, drawing on GiveWell's investigation of the organization.

== Media coverage ==
ImmigrationWorks USA has been covered by The New York Times and its president and CEO, Tamar Jacoby, has been cited in NYT articles on immigration to the United States. Jacoby has also been cited repeatedly in her capacity as ImmigrationWorks USA CEO in The Wall Street Journal. ImmigrationWorks USA has also been cited in Forbes, Business Insider, and The Economist.
