= Robert H. Krieble =

Robert H. Krieble (August 22, 1916 – May 8, 1997) was an American chemist who co-founded the Loctite Corporation in 1953 along with his father, Vernon K. Krieble, and was in the company in various capacities until 1986, having been chief executive from 1964 to 1985. In 1978, Krieble joined the board of The Heritage Foundation, where he became vice chairman in 1985. He also was on the board of the Free Congress Foundation.

== Early life and education ==
Krieble obtained a chemistry degree from Haverford College in Haverford, Pennsylvania, in 1935, and a doctorate from Johns Hopkins University in Baltimore in 1939.

== Career ==
After several years at the Socony Vacuum Oil Company, Krieble joined General Electric in 1943. "Mr. Krieble remained with General Electric, rising from research chemist to general manager of the chemical development department, until he left in 1956 to work full time at Loctite", according to profile in The New York Times

In 1989, he formed the Krieble Institute "to promote democracy and economic freedom in the Soviet Union and Eastern Europe".

With the institute, "he made more than 80 trips over there, conducting seminars, meeting with leaders and training a full-time network of over 20,000 field experts to establish political economic reform."

In 1990, US President George H. W. Bush appointed him to the executive committee of Citizens Democracy Corps.

== Death ==
Krieble died May 8, 1997, at his home in Old Lyme, Connecticut, at age 80.

== Legacy ==
The Heritage Foundation runs a "Robert H. Krieble Lecture" series in his honor, and since 1998 provides a "Robert H. Krieble Fellow in Coalition Relations" based on an endowment by Krieble's family. Krieble donated about $100,000 a year to Heritage for almost a decade.

Krieble was awarded a "Freedom Flame" award by the Center for Security Policy in 1994.
