= Impediment to expulsion =

Deportation barrier

Impediment to expulsion are practical or legal barriers that prevent a country from enforcing an expulsion or deportation decision of a non-national.

Examples of impediments to expulsion in certain countries are:

- A government's decision on a temporary enforcement halt or suspension of all deportations to a specific country due to, for example, war.
- The home country refuses to receive the person.
- The foreigner's identity was not established.
- Transport is not possible.
- Serious difficulties would arise due to the foreigner's health condition.

In some countries and cases, a person who has been asylum seeker but has received negative decision, may still be entitled to reside in the country where the person has applied for a residence permit due to such impediments, and may get a temporary or permanent residence permit.

== See also ==
- Cancellation of removal in the United States, formerly known as suspension of deportation
- Government failure
- Perverting the course of justice
- Right of return
- Stateless
