= Good moral character =

Beliefs and values considered beneficial to society

In United States law, good moral character can be assessed through the requirement of virtuous acts or by principally evaluating negative conduct. Whether the assessment of good moral character depends more on the evaluator or the assessee has been the subject of significant debate, and a consensus has not been reached between scholars, jurists, courts, administrative agencies, and legislators. Legal judgments of good moral character can include consideration of honesty, trustworthiness, diligence, reliability, respect for the law, integrity, candor, discretion, observance of fiduciary duty, respect for the rights of others, absence of hatred and discrimination, fiscal responsibility, mental and emotional stability, profession-specific criteria such as pledging to honor the Constitution and uphold the law, and the absence of a criminal conviction. Since the moral character of a person is an intrinsic psychological characteristic and cannot be measured directly, some scholars and statutes have used the phrase "behaved as a person of good moral character".

People must have good moral character determined as a fact of law in predominately two contexts – (1) state-issued licensure that allows one to work and practice a regulated profession and (2) federal government-issued U.S. citizenship certificates whereby an immigrant undergoes naturalization to become a citizen. Many laws create a paradox by placing the burden of proof of good moral character on the applicant while such a proof, but not the law, necessitates that the evaluators assess the beliefs and values of the applicant.

Good moral character is the opposite of moral turpitude, another legal concept in the United States used in similar instances.

== Assessments ==
Good moral character is usually considered to be present when a person has several positive moral findings and has no-to-minimal negative moral findings. Positive evidence of good moral character can include letters of recommendation, pursuing education, working six days a week, owning one's home, attending church every Sunday, marrying one's high-school sweetheart, having strong ties to one's nuclear family, coaching little league teams, paying taxes, paying bills on time, and volunteering in the community.

Moral luck might influence the assessments of moral character. If one volunteers to help others, they may be considered a better person if something bad, uncontrollable, and unexpected happens to them while they are working. For example, a man who is stung by a bee while mowing the lawn for an elderly neighbor is often rated as having a better moral character than a similar man who is not stung by a bee.

Negative findings of moral character can include a single legal citation, working for a marijuana farm or dispensary, having children without being married, not paying taxes, dishonesty, receiving government support, and advocating for racism. According to some moral character assessors, virtually all crimes such as city ordinance violations, misdemeanors, as well as felonies are considered to be de facto evidence that a person does not have good moral character. However, many states exclude minor traffic violations as part of a person's character assessment. The presence of any negative finding can outweigh several positive findings.

== In immigration law ==
Even minor violations of the law can be the sole reason for denying citizenship. The United States Citizenship and Immigration Services describes "good moral character" as an absence of involvement in the following activities:

- Being convicted of murder
- Being convicted of an aggravated felony or Federal crime, which includes:
  - Murder, rape, or sexual abuse of a minor
  - Illicit trafficking in controlled substances
  - Firearms, destructive devices, and explosive materials offenses
  - Money laundering
  - Crimes of violence for which the term of imprisonment is at least one year
  - Theft and burglary offenses for which the term of imprisonment is at least one year
  - Crimes involving the demand for or receipt of ransom
  - Crimes involving child pornography
  - Crimes involving a violation of the Racketeer Influenced and Corrupt Organizations Act (RICO)
  - A second or subsequent gambling offense for which a one-year or greater term of imprisonment may be imposed
  - Prostitution managing and transporting offenses
  - Crimes against the government
  - Offenses that jeopardize national security
  - Offenses that involve fraud or deceit in which the victims' aggregate losses exceed $10,000
  - Tax evasion involving a government loss in excess of $10,000
  - People smuggling, except for first offenses involving attempts to enable entry by a relative of the accused
  - Certain offenses committed by immigrants who were previously deported for having committed a crime
  - Passport fraud offenses with a term of imprisonment of one year or greater, except for first offenses involving attempts to enable entry by a relative of the accused
  - Failure to appear to serve a sentence for which the underlying offense is punishable by imprisonment for five or more years
  - Offenses involving commercial bribery, counterfeiting, forgery, or trafficking in vehicles with altered identification numbers with a term of imprisonment of at least one year
  - Offenses involving obstruction of justice, perjury, subornation of perjury, and witness tampering with a term of imprisonment of at least one year
  - Failure to appear in court pursuant to court order to answer to a felony charge for which a sentence of two or more years’ imprisonment may be imposed
  - Committing or being convicted of one or more crimes involving "moral turpitude"
  - Committing and being convicted of two or more offenses with a total sentence of five or more years
  - Being confined to a penal institution during the statutory period (either the preceding three or five years, depending on the circumstances, or one year for Armed Forces expedited cases) for an aggregate of 180 days or more
  - Committing and being convicted of two or more gambling offenses
  - Earning your principal income from gambling.
  - Being involved in prostitution or commercialized vice
  - Being involved in smuggling illegal aliens into the United States
  - Being a habitual drunkard
  - Practicing polygamy
  - Willfully failing or refusing to support dependents
  - Giving false testimony under oath in order to receive benefits under the Immigration and Nationality Act

Additionally, several other prior activities can disqualify a person from having a current "good moral character"

- Failing to register with the Selective Service System
- Providing false information in documents
- Falsely claiming U.S. citizenship

== In employment ==
Teachers, nurses, physicians, attorneys, barbers, liquor salespersons, pharmacists, and many other professionals require a state-issued license to perform their job. In order to obtain a license to work, one must meet the regular non-moral requirements such as years of education and also convince the state board that the applicant has good moral character. However, the criteria used to determine good moral character can vary significantly. Background checks are a type of verification of good moral character and they are often accompanied by drug testing. For admission to the bar in the United States, lawyers must go through extensive moral character checks as part of the application process. Employers and some government regulations also require good moral character for positions such as executioners, or for operating businesses selling pornographic materials.

On May 14, 2019, Oklahoma enacted a law to remove the good moral character clauses from their licensure requirements and implemented more objective standards. In 2019, Mississippi enacted legislation to limit the use of "vague" terms such as "moral turpitude" and "good character" by state agencies.

== In medicine ==
A 1975 survey by Camenisch included responses from 19 state medical board presidents (respondents) wherein they placed eight characteristics of good moral character in order of importance from most to least.

They were (in ranked order):

1. readiness to abide by laws governing medical practice (e.g., abortion and drug laws);
2. willingness to abide by moral demands of doctor-patient relationship (e.g., to observe confidentiality);
3. ranking patient's well-being as his highest goal in his practice of medicine;
4. willingness to abide by professional etiquette (e.g., not to advertise);
5. dedication to delivering the highest quality of medical care he and the science are capable of;
6. dedication to enhancing public health through preventative as well as curative measures;
7. dedication to seeing that all needing medical care get it under conditions they can meet without hardship; and
8. preference for the traditional fee-for-service mode of practice.

Camenisch writes, "The grouping of the eight elements in the order of importance makes it clear that 'good moral character' in the minds of the respondents emphatically has more to do with the professional's obligations to a limited number of specific individuals, to his patients, than to the society at large, to the entire population of those needing health care... this second area ... includes such matters as the distribution of health care and the mode and ease of patient access to it. ... this low ranking of societal issues and responsibilities is of special interest in light of the fact that these same respondents, when asked to indicate the major differences between professional and other occupational licensing, gave highest place to 'the degree of dedication to the public well-being expected of the licensee.'"
