= Catch and release (immigration) =

Practice in United States immigration enforcement

In United States immigration enforcement, "catch and release" refers to a practice of releasing migrants to the community while they await hearings in immigration court, as an alternative to holding them in immigration detention. The migrants whom U.S. immigration enforcement agencies have allowed to remain in the community pending immigrant hearings have been those deemed low risk, such as children, families, and those seeking asylum.

There is no formal definition of the phrase, which can be used as a pejorative. Rather, the phrase refers to a "collection of policies, court precedents, executive actions and federal statutes spanning more than 20 years, cobbled together throughout Democratic and Republican administrations." The Trump administration has used the phrase as a catch-all term for laws or policies preventing the holding of apprehended migrants in immigration detention.

== Etymology and criticism ==
The phrase catch and release originated in recreational fishing over a century ago. It originally referred to releasing fish after capture. The phrase "entered the political lexicon during the George W. Bush administration."

A number of scholars and writers, such as geographer Reece Jones, media studies scholar Hector Amaya, and commentator Michelle Goldberg, regard the phrase as dehumanizing because it likens human beings to fish.

== History ==
=== Under George W. Bush ===
In testimony to the Senate Judiciary Committee in October 2005, Secretary of Homeland Security Michael Chertoff said that the DHS would "Return every single illegal entrant – no exceptions." In his testimony, Chertoff said that in the previous fiscal year, the U.S. Border Patrol immediately returned almost 900,000 Mexicans apprehended entering the U.S. to Mexico, but that of the 160,000 non-Mexican nationals apprehended, about 30,000 were removed from the U.S. Chertoff said that most others were released pending immigration hearings and that few appeared for the hearings. He called for more beds in immigration detention. In July 2006, Chertoff indicated in House committee testimony that an infusion of funding for more immigration detention had allowed DHS to detain almost all non-Mexican illegal immigrants.

In August 2006, Chertoff said that the "'catch-and-release' practice that for years helped many illegal immigrants stay in the United States unhindered" had ended and that DHS detained 99% of apprehended non-Mexican border-crossers. (Mexican border-crossers could be subject to expedited removal.) Chertoff said that more immigration detention had helped deter illegal immigration; advocates for immigrant rights "questioned whether the border crackdown actually deters people from sneaking into the U.S., noting that some illegal immigrants may just be shifting entry points to cross at more remote and dangerous areas."

=== Under Barack Obama ===
In 2014, Chuck Grassley and other Republican senators introduced legislation to close what they called a "catch-and-release loophole"; the legislation would reverse the Zadvydas v. Davis decision, allowing DHS to detain "non-removable immigrants" (those whose home countries will not accept their return) for more than six months under certain circumstances.

=== Under Donald Trump ===
Donald Trump, as a presidential candidate in 2016, said that "Under my administration, anyone who illegally crosses the border will be detained until they are removed out of our country and back to the country from which they came." As president, Trump has blamed "liberal Democrats" for what he called "laws like Catch & Release"; in fact, the phrase refers to a "collection of policies, court precedents, executive actions and federal statutes spanning more than 20 years, cobbled together throughout Democratic and Republican administrations."

In February 2017, Secretary of Homeland Security John Kelly, pursuant to executive orders by Trump, ordered an end to so-called "catch-and-release" policies. However, by June 2017, thousands of people apprehended by U.S. authorities were still released from detention while they await immigration hearings, in part due to limited spaces available in immigration detention and legal limits on who may be detained and for how long. For example, a court ruling prohibits detaining women and children for more than 21 days.

Trump administration officials have argued that the Victims of Trafficking and Violence Protection Act of 2000, legislation to aid victims of human trafficking, "includes a catch-and-release loophole" because "unaccompanied children 'are exempt from prompt return to their home country' unless they come from Canada or Mexico, according to the Department of Homeland Security."

In April 2018, Trump signed an executive memorandum directs federal officials to report to him on measures to "expeditiously end 'catch and release' practices"; the memorandum directed officials to produce reports on facilities (such as military bases) that could be used for immigration detention. The memorandum did not establish any concrete policy changes. The memo did not provide a way to fund additional detentions; appropriations would have to be made by Congress and mandatory detention at the border would be costly (the Center for American Progress think tank estimated a cost of $9 billion over a decade). Democratic U.S. Representative Henry Cuellar said that the directive was "more show, more salesmanship, than anything else" since congressional approval would be needed to pay for expanding detention capabilities.

On April 6, 2018, Attorney General Jeff Sessions directed federal prosecutors "to adopt immediately a zero tolerance policy for all offenses" related to the misdemeanor of improper entry into the United States, and that this "zero-tolerance policy shall supersede any existing policies". This would aim to criminally convict first-time offenders that would previously have faced civil and administrative proceedings, with criminal convictions previously usually reserved for those who committed the felony of illegal re-entry after removal.

Under a 1997 settlement agreement and consent decree, the children of detained parents charged with immigration violations could not be held in immigration detention for more than 20 days, and a 2016 ruling by the Ninth Circuit Court of Appeals in the case Flores v. Lynch upheld this requirement while saying that this did not that imply that the adults accompanying such children must be released. The Obama administration had complied with the ruling by detaining and releasing the parents together with the children, while the "zero tolerance" directive led in practice to separation of these children from their parents. No system was established for reuniting families or keeping track of family associations.

On June 20, 2018, Trump bowed to intense political pressure and signed an executive order to reverse the policy while still maintaining "zero tolerance" border control by detaining entire families together. When it became clear that this could not be sustained within the scope of court rulings, Customs and Border Protection Commissioner Kevin McAleenan announced on June 25, 2018, that the agency would cease referring every person accused of crossing the border illegally for prosecution, effectively ending the "zero tolerance" policy. McAleenan said that the policy presented enormous operational and logistical challenges for Border Patrol agents, including overcrowding of children in Border Patrol holding cells while their parents were processed in court and held in immigration detention; federal agents complained of spending "more time processing immigrants than guarding the border".

On April 16, 2019, Attorney General Barr announced a new policy to deny bail to asylum seekers in an effort to end the catch and release policy. On July 2, 2019, the Western District Court of Washington issued a class-wide ruling to require bond hearings for noncitizens who have shown a credible fear of persecution in their home country, and are currently held separate from their families. On March 27, 2020, the Ninth Circuit Court of Appeals upheld the ruling, saying that even though Congress has barred lower courts from issuing injunctions restraining the operation of immigration removal proceedings "other than with respect ... to an individual alien", individual alien just means it cannot be an organization, and the class is filled with individual aliens. A dissenting opinion said that such a reading renders "individual" superfluous.

== See also ==
- Own recognizance
- Trump administration family separation policy
- Operation Streamline
- Family detention
- Jennings v. Rodriguez
