= Reinstatement of removal =

Immigration enforcement procedure in USA

Reinstatement of removal is an immigration enforcement procedure in the United States in which a previously deported immigrant can be again deported for subsequent illegal entries with no required judicial review except in very limited circumstances.

== History ==
=== Existence before IIRIRA ===
Prior to the Illegal Immigration Reform and Immigrant Responsibility Act of 1996, reinstatement of removal only applied to people previously deported (not excluded) on grounds relating to certain criminal convictions, failing to register, falsification of documents, or security or terrorist related grounds.

=== Formalization in IIRIRA (1996, active since April 1997) ===
Reinstatement of removal was introduced in legislation as part of the Illegal Immigration Reform and Immigrant Responsibility Act of 1996, passed by the 104th United States Congress and signed into law by then-United States President Bill Clinton, and active as of April 1, 1997.

=== Subsequent changes and refinements ===
The practice of reinstatement of removal has refined and evolved through a mix of legislation, guidelines by immigration enforcement agencies, and court decisions. These include:

- The Legal Immigration Family Equity Act of 2000 established that those who had a pending application for adjustment of status in various categories could not be subject to reinstatement of removal.
- In three decisions between 2003 and 2005, various courts of appeals held that those who had affirmatively applied for adjustment of status prior to April 1, 1997, could not be subject to reinstatement of removal.
- In Fernandez-Vargas v. Gonzales (2006), the United States Supreme Court ruled that reinstatement of removal applied even for people who had re-entered the United States prior to April 1, 1997, if they had made no effort to adjust status prior to that date. This was in contrast to the general belief in the immigration law community at the time, that reinstatement of removal applied only if the most recent re-entry was on or after April 1, 1997.

== Procedure and conditions ==
=== Applicability ===
Reinstatement of removal may apply to aliens (people who not United States citizens or permanent residents) who satisfy all these conditions:

1. The alien received a prior order of removal (or deportation or exclusion). This may have been expedited removal, stipulated removal, or removal or deportation through regular court proceedings.
2. The alien departed the United States after receiving the order. This includes both voluntary departure and forcible removal. The key requirement is that the alien received an order of removal, deportation, or exclusion (Note that if the alien did not depart, then the reinstatement of removal does not apply. However, the earlier removal can still be executed).
3. The alien subsequently re-entered the United States without authorization.
4. The alien is not currently in authorized status.
5. None of the exceptions discussed in the Exceptions section apply to the alien.

Although the language of the statute refers only to prior orders of removal, section 309(d)(2) of the Illegal Immigration Reform and Immigrant Responsibility Act of 1996 clarifies that any reference in law to an order of removal should be interpreted to include orders of exclusion and deportation. Thus, reinstatement of removal applies to orders of removal, deportation, and exclusion.

=== Notice and opportunity to contest ===
An immigration officer who establishes that the alien meets all these requirements may decide to pursue a reinstatement of removal. This involves the following steps:

- The officer provides the alien with a written notice of his or her determination (on Form I-871).
- The officer advises the alien that he or she may make a written or oral statement contesting the determination.
- If the alien wishes to make such a statement, the officer allows the alien to do so and considers whether the alien's statement warrants reconsideration of the determination.

After the officer has determined that the alien meets the conditions for deportation, the officer reinstates the previous order of exclusion, deportation, or removal.

=== Appealing the reinstatement order ===
The immigration officer's decision is considered final and there is no scope for appeal within the immigration enforcement bureaucracy. However, courts of appeals in all jurisdictions in the United States have ruled that a noncitizen may appeal a reinstatement order to the court of appeals in the jurisdiction within 30 days of the reinstatement being issued. Filing an appeal does not automatically grant a stay of deportation, and the person must file a stay of removal. Conversely, being deported does not preclude a person from filing, or proceeding with, an appeal challenging the reinstatement.

If the DHS reinstatement order was issued in a different jurisdiction from that where the original order of removal being reinstated was issued, the person appealing may have a choice of which court of appeal to appeal the case in.

=== Exceptions ===
There are two main kinds of exceptions:

1. Reasonable Fear: If the alien expresses a fear of persecution or torture in his or her home country, the alien is referred to a reasonable fear interview with a United States Citizenship and Immigration Services officer. If the fear determination is unfavorable, the alien is subject to reinstatement of removal. If the determination is favorable, the alien is scheduled for a hearing before an immigration judge.
2. Those with pending applications for benefits or adjustment of status: The immigration officer cannot reinstate an earlier order of removal while an application of any of these types is pending. The order may be reinstated after a final decision to deny the application for adjustment has been made. The eligible types of applications include:
  - Some types of adjustment of status under INA 245A, covered by class action lawsuits, as described in the Legal Immigration Family Equity Act (LIFE act), Section 1104(g).
  - Section 202 of Public Law 105-100, the Nicaraguan Adjustment and Central American Relief Act, applies to people from Nicaragua and Cuba, as described in the LIFE Act, section 1505(a)(1).
  - Section 203 of NACARA (applies to people from El Salvador, Guatemala, and Eastern Europe), as described in the LIFE Act, Section 1505(c).
  - Section 902 of the Haitian Refugee Immigrant Fairness Act, as described in the LIFE Act, Section 1505(b)(1).

Prior to the passage of LIFE Act, exceptions were carved out only for HRIFA and NACARA Section 202 applicants.

== Related procedures ==
A "Just Facts" summary by the Immigration Policy Center identified a few other summary removal practices similar to reinstatement of removal:

- Expedited removal: This applies to noncitizens who arrive at a designated port of entry, or those who have recently entered without authorization.
- Stipulated removal: Here, the person is formally charged and placed in immigration court proceedings before an immigration judge. However, the person does not actually appear before the judge, but rather agrees (or “stipulates”) to deportation and gives up his or her right to a hearing. The immigration judge may enter the order of removal without seeing the person and asking him or her whether the stipulation was entered into knowingly and voluntarily.
