= American Immigration Lawyers Association =

Voluntary bar association

- Official AILA Logo
- Abbreviation: AILA
- Formation: October 14, 1946; 80 years ago
- Type: Professional Bar Association
- Tax ID no.: 23-7085097
- Legal status: 501(c)(6)
- Headquarters: Washington, D.C., United States
- Members: 15,000 members
- Executive Director: Benjamin Johnson
- President, Executive Committee: Allen Orr
- Subsidiaries: 1331 G Street LLC, AILA Professional Services LLC, American Immigration Council _{501(c)(3)}
- Revenue: $13,972,228 (2016)
- Expenses: $13,409,203 (2016)
- Employees: 71 (2016)
- Volunteers: 765 (2016)
- Website: www.aila.org
- Formerly called: Association of Immigration and Nationality Lawyers

The American Immigration Lawyers Association (AILA), founded on October 14, 1946, is a voluntary bar association of more than 15,000 attorneys and law professors who practice and teach immigration law. AILA member attorneys represent U.S. families seeking permanent residence for close family members, as well as U.S. businesses seeking talent from the global marketplace. AILA members also represent foreign students, entertainers, athletes, and asylum seekers, sometimes on a pro bono basis. AILA is a nonpartisan, not-for-profit organization that provides continuing legal education, information, professional services, and expertise through its 38 chapters and over 50 national committees. Its national headquarters are in Washington, D.C. The mission of the AILA is to promote justice and advocate for fair and legal immigration law and policy. They also aim to enhance the professional development of lawyers that work with them.

== History ==
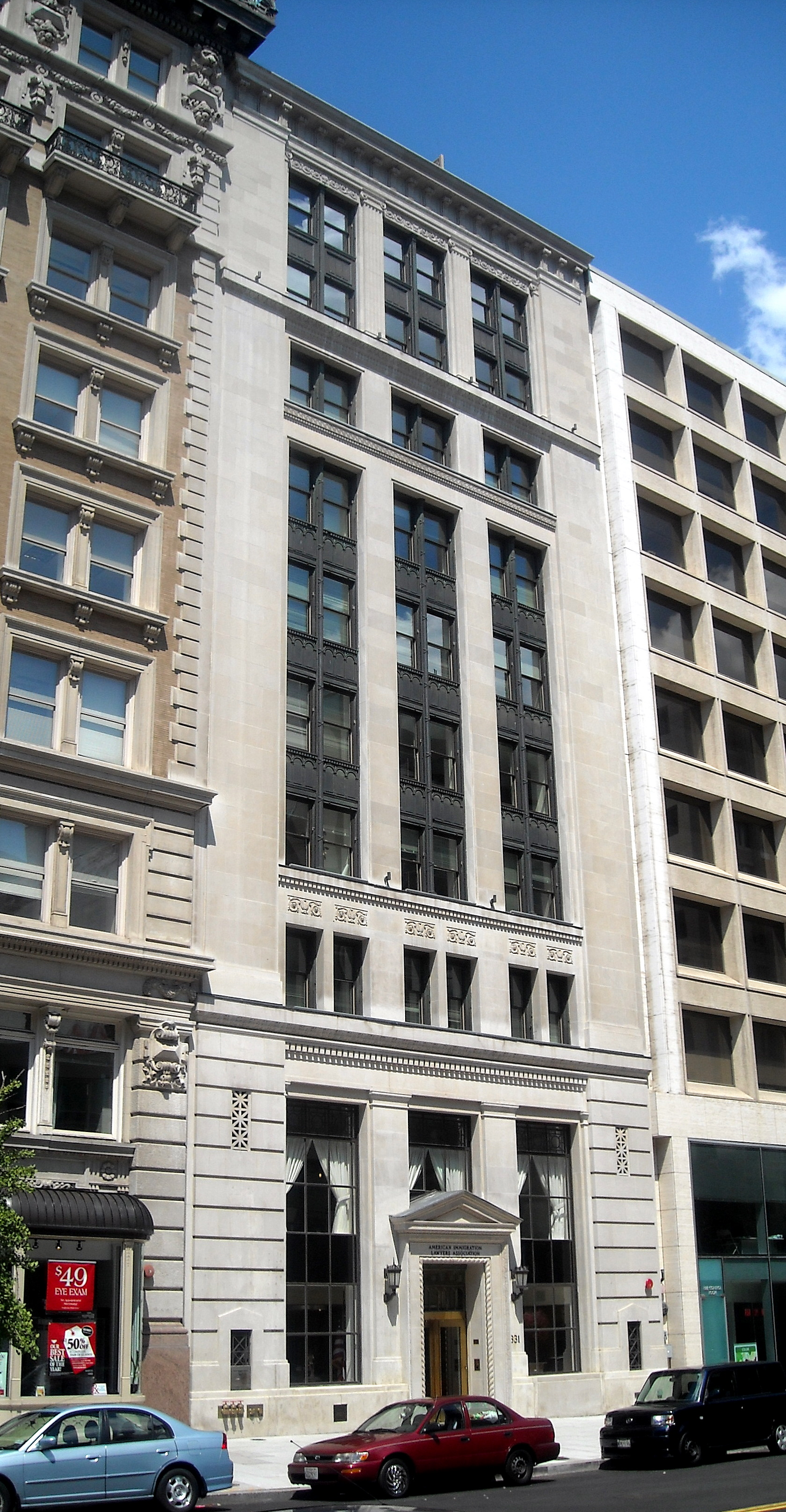
American Immigration Lawyers Association offices at 1331 G Street, NW in Washington, D.C.

Originally called the Association of Immigration and Nationality Lawyers, the association was founded on October 14, 1946 by a group of 19 immigration lawyers and professionals in Manhattan, New York City. Twelve of the association founders had recently worked for the US Immigration and Naturalization Service, and saw an opportunity to use their professional standing "to elevate the standard and reputation of the practitioner appearing before the Immigration Service". Josh Koenigsberg served as the first president of the association with Gaspare Cusumano as vice president, Anita Streep as secretary, and Daniel Caputi as treasurer.

In 1982, the association established a national headquarters in Washington, D.C., and it was renamed the American Immigration Lawyers Association.

By 1985, the association had 1,800 members; a three-fold increase from 1975. As of 2017, there were more than 15,000 AILA members in 39 chapters in the United States and across the world. The AILA has attorneys from more than 58 countries, including in North America, South America, Africa, and parts of Europe.

== Publications ==
AILA Publications is the publishing arm of the American Immigration Lawyers Association. It publishes information and analysis serving the practicing immigration lawyer and those in need of immigration law information. It is the publisher of notable titles including Kurzban's Immigration Law Sourcebook, Immigration Consequences of Criminal Activity, AILA's Asylum Primer, Litigating Immigration Cases in Federal Court, Representing Clients in Immigration Court, and Essentials of Immigration Law.

== American Immigration Council ==
American Immigration Council
- Formation: 1987; 39 years ago
- Type: 501(c)(3) organization
- Headquarters: 1331 G St. NW, Suite 200, Washington, D.C., 20005
- Executive director: Jeremy Robbins
- Subsidiaries: Immigration Policy Center
- Revenue: $8.2 m USD (2023)
- Website: americanimmigrationcouncil.org
- Formerly called: American Immigration Law Foundation

The American Immigration Council is a Washington, D.C.–based 501(c)(3) nonprofit organization and advocacy group that is a subsidiary of AILA. It was established in 1987, originally as the American Immigration Law Foundation. In 2021, New American Economy merged into the council.

Immigration Impact, "the only news site exclusively committed to covering immigration issues", is a project of the council.

== See also ==
- Advocates for Immigrant Rights and Reconciliation
- Immigration detention in the United States
- American Immigration Council
- National Immigration Law Center
- Refugee and Immigrant Center for Education and Legal Services (RAICES)
- Right of asylum
