= Immigration judge =

United States official who confers U.S. citizenship

Appearing before an Immigration Judge

An immigration judge, formerly known as a special inquiry officer, is an employee of the United States Department of Justice, which is part of the executive branch of the US government rather than the judicial branch. An immigration judge decides cases of aliens in various types of removal proceedings. During the proceedings, an immigration judge may grant any type of immigration relief or benefit to a noncitizen, as well as to his or her family members.

An immigration judge is appointed by, and works under the direction of, the U.S. Attorney General. In other words, under the Immigration and Nationality Act (INA), immigration judges act as representatives of the Attorney General and can only act according to authority delegated by the Attorney General or by the INA. Despite not being part of the judicial branch of government, immigration judges are quasi-judicials, formerly known as “special inquiry officers," who handle removal and deportation cases and are meant to decide independently.

Immigration judges are not administrative law judges (ALJs) and they do not conduct formal adjudications covered by the Administrative Procedure Act (APA). Under current federal law, they are non-ALJ adjudicators beyond the protection of the APA.

There are approximately 700 immigration judges located at 71 immigration courts and three adjudication centers across the United States. An immigration judge can either be a citizen or a national of the United States.

Chief differences between immigration judges and articles III judges

Unlike article III judges appointed to district courts, immigration judges operate under the executive branch and are not entitled to tenure. Immigration judges are also not subjected to confirmation by the senate, but rather are appointed by and are subject to review by the Attorney General who may override any ruling made by an immigration judge. The Board of Immigration Appeals (BIA)–which also reviews the rulings of immigration judges–and over 600 Immigration Judges in 73 immigration courts and 3 adjudication centers nationwide fall under the jurisdiction of the Executive Office for Immigration Review (EOIR). Foreign nationals applying for asylum while residing in the United States are first brought before an asylum officer (AO), who may grant or deny asylum or other forms of relief. In more complicated cases, applicants are brought before an immigration judges.

Issues Immigration Judges Face

A persisting issue among immigration courts is a serious backlog of cases, which has been attributed to compounding factors including a shortage of immigration judges. In an effort to confront this, the EOIR employed 649 IJs at the end of 2023 after hiring 104 in 2022 and continues to seek the expansion of immigration courts. Despite their growing numbers, understaffing of both immigration judges and supporting staff has been identified as a key contributor to the ever increasing backlog of cases.

In another effort to confront the backlog in 2018, the DOJ began putting quotas on the number of cases an immigration judge sees in a year. Scholars and Judges alike have voiced concerns over this move by the DOJ, citing the need for both independence and quality assurance in the courts, with quotas placed on immigration judges forcing them to close cases at a rate of over two per day. Mentioned alongside these quotas were remand rates or cases overturned by the Board of Immigration Appeals (BIA) or Circuit Courts. The quotas produced in 2018 required no lower than 580 cases per Judge in a given year and no higher than 20% reverse rates. As of July 2024 there was a backlog of 3.5 million cases. To combat this backlog, the EOIR requested an additional $367 million in funding to create 150 new immigration judge teams consisting of 750 attorneys and support staff in 2024.

Circulating concerns about the inconsistency of the immigration adjudication process are highlighted by the wide variety of rulings among immigration judges, even when comparing the rulings of a given court. This variation between judges was previously noted by the U.S. Government Accountability Office (GAO) in 2008 with the recommendations for the courts in addressing disparate asylum outcomes between different judges. Despite the recommendations made in 2008, the San Francisco Immigration Court’s varied rates of relief in 2025 demonstrates the persistence of this issue. The highest rate of relief provided by an individual immigration judge in the San Francisco Immigration Court between 2020 and 2025 was 98% and the lowest rate was 5.9%. During that same time period an immigration judge in Houston provided relief to 0.0% of cases before him.

== See also ==
- Executive Office for Immigration Review
