= Immigration Policy Center =

The Immigration Policy Center (IPC) is the research and policy arm of the American Immigration Council, a 501(c)(3) organization in the United States dedicated to promoting immigration to the United States and protecting the rights and privileges of immigrants in the United States.

== History ==
The Immigration Policy Center was founded in 2003. Its parent body, the American Immigration Council, was founded as a 501(c)(3) organization in 1987.

== Goals ==
The main goals of the Immigration Policy Center, according to the About page on their website, are:

1. Contributing research on issues related to immigrants and their impact on the economy, job market, and crime in the United States.
2. Bridging the gap between advocates and academics, politicians, and the public, by disseminating their research widely and holding conferences and briefings.
3. Combating claims made by anti-immigration groups that they consider erroneous and harmful to their cause (later section).

The goals of the American Immigration Council, the parent body, are:

1. Trying to convince American citizens that immigrants make positive and enduring contributions to the United States;
2. Promoting immigration policies that they consider "sensible" and "humane";
3. Advocacy against enforcement practices for existing immigration laws that they view as being in violation of human rights and constitutional laws;
4. Working towards the goals of "justice" and "fairness" for immigrants in the United States.

The IPC generally favors expanded opportunities for immigration at all skill levels, opposes deportations of illegal immigrants and legal immigrants who violate visa terms or other laws, and favors a path to citizenship for current (legal and illegal) immigrants as well as future immigrants to the United States. It has also expressed opposition in the past to proposals such as the Krieble Foundation's Red Card scheme (endorsed by Newt Gingrich in the 2012 Republican presidential primary) that would create a huge guest worker program without offering a path to citizenship.

== People ==
The Immigration Policy Center has eight listed staff members on its website, including Walter Ewing and Mary Giovagnoli.

== Issues covered ==
The IPC investigates and publishes material on the following issues related to immigration: demographics, economics of immigration, election and politics, enforcement and employment verification, health care, history of immigration, immigration and crime, immigration reform, integration and citizenship, immigration and unemployment, legalization, legislation and policy, state and local issues, and "restrictionists."

=== Demographics of immigration ===
The IPC publishes reports both on the raw statistics of immigration from different regions and ethnic groups and on the consequences of such immigration. This has included reports on immigration from Africa, Asia, and Latin America.

=== Economics of immigration ===
The IPC has published many pieces suggesting that immigration liberalization measures, including proposed legislation in 2006 and 2013, would be economically beneficial to current citizens of the United States as well as immigrants. The IPC also published a "Just the Facts" backgrounder claiming that the 2013 legislative proposals related to immigration would not increase unemployment, contrary to the assertions of critics of these proposals. In June 2013, after the Congressional Budget Office released a report with estimates of the fiscal impact of the proposed immigration legislation, the IPC published a piece arguing that this report underscored the case for pushing forth the immigration legislation currently under consideration in the US Congress.

=== Immigration and crime ===
The IPC has published many backgrounders on the topic of immigration and crime in the United States, all pointing towards the conclusion that immigrants to the United States appear to commit less crime and have lower incarceration rates than native-born Americans. The IPC also published a press release critical of a report by the Center for Immigration Studies that appeared to cast doubt on the conclusions and methods of a previous IPC report.

In addition, the IPC has published material on various federal and state government programs in the United States to tackle the problem of immigrant criminality, including the Secure Communities Program and the Criminal Alien Program.

=== Restrictionists ===
The IPC uses the term "restrictionist" to describe political groups, think tanks, and other organizations in the United States that advocate reduced levels of legal immigration and crackdowns on illegal immigration. The IPC puts out documents, articles, and press releases to counter claims made by restrictionists that they consider inaccurate and misleading. The restrictionist individuals and groups critiqued by IPC in the past have included the Federation for American Immigration Reform (FAIR), US Representative Lamar Smith, and others. IPC has also published detailed articles and reports on the US restrictionist movement and its origins and history, listing FAIR, NumbersUSA, the Center for Immigration Studies, the Minutemen, and VDARE as prominent restrictionist groups. The IPC has also linked to the Southern Poverty Law Center's critical analysis of the origins of CIS, NumbersUSA, and FAIR, all of which were founded with assistance from John Tanton.

== Publications ==
The Immigration Policy Center publishes a number of writings on its website ranging from quick backgrounders for politicians, journalists, and the public to in-depth writings. Their quick backgrounders called "Just the Facts" are published a few times a month and are widely referenced as go-to sources for information. For instance, their "Just the Facts" pieces on the DREAM Act and on Deferred Action for Childhood Arrivals have been referenced by a number of writers such as Alex Nowrasteh of the Cato Institute, The Huffington Post, and PBS. IPC also has a "Top Resources" page that links to its most important and frequently accessed "Just the Facts" pages.

The IPC also publishes Special Reports (their most in-depth publication type), and Perspectives (fresh perspectives on existing immigration debates).

== Think Immigration ==
In 2013, the Immigration Policy Center launched a separate website titled "Think Immigration" that was intended to carry out collaborative conversations on issues related to immigration to the United States. Everybody was invited to participate in the online conversation by adding comments.

== Media coverage ==
IPC puts out press releases, typically in the wake of important immigration-related news events such as legislative proposals, judicial decisions, or the release of public data relevant to immigration to the United States.

In addition, IPC staffers are quoted in print and online news articles on US immigration-related issues, in publications such as The New York Times, The Guardian (UK), The Washington Post, ABC News, The Christian Science Monitor, and Talking Points Memo.

== See also ==
- American Immigration Lawyers Association
- Immigration Reform Law Institute
- National Immigrant Justice Center
- Migration Policy Institute
- ImmigrationWorks USA
