= Immigration policy of the second Trump administration =

Donald Trump was inaugurated for his second term as president of the United States on January 20, 2025, with one of his key campaign promises being to crack down on immigration. Since then, through a combination of executive orders and policymaking, Trump and his administration have sought to restrict immigration, including declaring a national emergency at the Mexico–United States border, blocking asylum seekers from entering the U.S., expanding the detention of apprehended migrants pending removal proceedings, suspending almost all refugee admissions to the U.S., seeking to restrict birthright citizenship for new children born to parents who are not U.S. permanent residents, and officially designating certain international cartels and criminal organizations as terrorists.

In addition to restricting future immigration, the Trump administration has embarked on campaigns of mass delegalization, terminating the legal status of millions of immigrants with temporary protected status and humanitarian parole; and of mass detention and deportation, vastly expanding the immigration detention and deportation operations conducted by the Department of Homeland Security. Trump also signed the Laken Riley Act on January 29, 2025, which mandates the detention, without bond, of immigrants who are arrested, charged with, or convicted of certain crimes; and invoked the Alien Enemies Act in March 2025.

Border encounters between migrants and U.S. Customs and Border Protection (CBP) continued to decline since Trump took office in 2025; refugee admissions have also plummeted. The overall strategy of the Trump administration, and the often maximalist tactics employed, primarily by the U.S. Department of Homeland Security, have received widespread criticism, and protests have erupted across the country in response. Legal challenges have been mounted in federal courts against many of the administration's actions, in some cases leading to injunctions.

The Republican Party-dominated Congress has passed legislation supporting the expansion of immigration enforcement activities. In 2025, Congress passed and President Donald Trump signed the One Big Beautiful Bill Act which appropriated $170 billion to immigration enforcement through 2029. In 2026, Congress passed and President Trump signed the Secure America Act which appropriated, through 2029, an additional $69.5 billion dollars.

== Policies and presidential actions ==
=== Proclamation of "invasion" and broad restrictions ===
President Trump issued Proclamation 10888, titled "Guaranteeing the States Protection Against Invasion", which mandates various actions. The proclamation claims that the steps and actions mandated are part of the executive branch's compliance with their duties under Article IV, Section 4 of the Constitution, which guarantees that the federal government will protect the states against invasion. President Trump considers the flow of immigrants at the southern border to be an invasion and so mandates the following steps:

1. Suspend the physical entry of aliens who are at the southern border and engaged in the invasion until the invasion has ended.
2. For aliens already within the United States, they cannot invoke laws, such as asylum laws, that would allow them to continue inside the United States.
3. The Department of Homeland Security can take any appropriate steps to remove any aliens involved in the invasion, including using expedited removal – which is a process whereby undocumented immigrants can be removed from the country without a full and formal court proceeding. This would expand the use of expedited removal as it would now apply both to undocumented immigrants within the U.S. and to those arriving at a U.S. border without authorization.

On July 2, 2025, US district court judge Randolph D. Moss ruled the proclamation illegal, stating he failed to find any statute or Constitutional provision that gave the president the authority to "adopt an alternative immigration system, which supplants the statutes that Congress has enacted and the regulations that the responsible agencies have promulgated." On April 24, 2026, the US Court of Appeals for the District of Columbia upheld Judge Moss's ruling blocking the proclamation. In her majority opinion, Judge Michelle Childs wrote that existing immigration law “does not allow the president to remove plaintiffs under summary removal procedures of his own making”.

=== Restricting admission and parole ===
President Trump's Executive Order 14165, titled "Securing Our Borders", makes three big changes to the process of applying for admission into the United States. This is followed by further actions to restrict admission and parole, primarily of asylum seekers.

==== Reinstating Migrant Protection Protocols ====
First, Trump reinstated the Migrant Protection Protocols (MPP), a policy also known as "Remain in Mexico" that was put in place during his first term in office. This program states that all asylum-seekers or refugees who arrive at the southern border seeking entry into the United States must remain in or return to Mexico while they await their admission or court removal proceedings, if already entered illegally. In other words, asylum-seekers cannot come into or stay in the United States during this waiting period.

==== Terminating the CBP One application ====
Secondly, this executive order also terminated the "CBP One" mobile application. This app was a program developed by U.S. Customs and Border Protection to allow migrants to secure immigration appointments, such as appointments for inspection and for asylum applications. Within an hour of Trump's inauguration, the app was discontinued and migrants who accessed CBP One found that their appointments were canceled. All appointments that were already scheduled at the time the executive order was signed were cancelled. The executive order claims that this will stop migrants, who are otherwise inadmissible, from using this app to facilitate their entry into the United States.

Following the termination of the CBP One application, the administration introduced the CBP Home app, which included a new "Intent to Depart" feature. This feature served as the registration platform for "Project Homecoming," a voluntary departure program established by executive order in May 2025. The program offered unauthorized immigrants travel arrangements and a cash stipend in exchange for agreeing to leave the United States.

The stipend was initially set at $1,000, later increased to $2,600, and was briefly raised to $3,000 during the 2025 Christmas holiday. According to the Department of Homeland Security (DHS), each self-deportation was projected to cost the government approximately $2,500, including the stipend, compared to an average of $18,245 for a non-voluntary removal. Based on internal data shared with Axios, as of July 16, 2026, approximately 132,000 individuals had departed through the program, with an additional 70,000 registered and awaiting departure. By the end of 2026, the program is projected to facilitate over 200,000 departures. Its budget was nearly $600 million, with funds expected to be exhausted by the end of August 2026; DHS is reportedly seeking a new contract to continue the initiative beyond that date.

The program also affected detention operations. A staff member from the Department of Government Efficiency (DOGE) introduced Project Homecoming to ICE facilities, resulting in case managers being placed at 40 ICE detention sites. Approximately half of the self-deportation cases involved detained immigrants, for whom the average detention time decreased from 50 to 17 days, helping to free up bed space in detention centers. Critics argued that the program would have been better administered by the UN's International Organization for Migration (IOM), which was initially involved but later withdrew. One source familiar with the program expressed concern that the initiative had been reduced to a logistical exercise—described as a "spreadsheet to buy plane tickets"—with insufficient attention given to participants' post-departure outcomes.

==== Ending categorical parole programs ====
Lastly, the executive order also put an end to categorical parole programs. These programs, also known as "Temporary Protected Status", allowed migrants from certain countries to stay in the U.S. for a certain period, due to various reasons generally including armed conflict or natural disaster. Executive Order 14165 terminates these programs. Paroled individuals are only to be admitted, or allowed to remain in the U.S., if they show an urgent humanitarian need or if they can contribute significantly to the United States. This change creates uncertainty as to whether individuals who would have previously been granted temporary status under one of the categorical parole programs, or who are currently in the United States under one of those programs, will now be able to come into or stay in the United States.

On June 25, 2026, in Mullin v. Doe, the Supreme Court barred judicial review of temporary protected status.

===== Termination of Family Reunification Parole Processes =====
A notice in the Federal Register states that DHS is terminating the Family Reunification Parole Processes programs as of December 15, 2025. If parole had not already expired by January 14, 2026, it terminated on that date.

=== Restricting refugee resettlement ===
President Trump signed Executive Order 14163, titled "Realigning the United States Refugee Admissions Program." This order proclaims that the entry of new refugees will be detrimental to the United States and, because of that, it suspends the entry of any new refugees under the current Refugee Admissions Program for a period of 90 days. In other words, no current refugee applications under the program can be accepted or denied until the program is resumed. In the meantime, only a few exceptions will be made to admit on a case-by-case basis refugees who are deemed not to pose a threat and whose admission is considered in the interest of the U.S.

After the 90 days, the Secretary of State and the Secretary of Homeland Security will report whether resuming the program will be beneficial to the United States. If so, the President can decide to resume the program. If not, they will continue to report every 90 days until the President decides that it is in the best interest of the U.S. to resume the Refugee Admissions Program. President Trump claims this is necessary to protect and preserve U.S. resources for citizens and to ensure that the refugees admitted have a chance to assimilate. Where the President is deriving the authority to do this is from the Immigration and Nationality Act (INA) and parts of the U.S. Code, which grant the President the ability to suspend entry of immigrants he deems would be detrimental to the United States.

In 2025, the Trump administration announced that it planned to slash refugee admissions to the US for 2026 to a record low of 7,500 refugees, down from a cap of 125,000 for 2025. The administration plans to prioritize Afrikaners, an ethnic group of white South Africans.

A memo dated 21 November 2025 by USCIS Director Joseph Edlow orders a review of all refugees admitted under the Biden administration. Following the 2025 Washington, D.C., National Guard shooting, USCIS put a "hold on all pending asylum applications". In March 2026, the administration lifted its "total ban on reviewing asylum applications, though the pause remains in effect for about 40 countries." In June 2026, to comply with an order by Judge John J. McConnell Jr. in Dorcas International Institute of Rhode Island v. USCIS, the administration announced it would end the hold.

The administration was reported to have moved to end thousands of asylum cases, arguing for asylum seekers to be deported to third countries.

Of the 4,499 people part of the Refugee Admissions Program from October 2025 to April 2026, 3 (Afghans) were not White South Africans.

==== White South African refugees ====
In February 2025, a refugee program officially known as Mission South Africa was launched by United States president Donald Trump under Executive Order 14204 to grant refugee status to white South Africans and other minorities in South Africa, primarily Afrikaners, under claims of systemic violence and racial discrimination linked to South Africa's post-apartheid land reform policies. The Trump administration attempted to justify the program by falsely alleging that White South African farmers were victims of what it described as a "genocide" and state-backed persecution.

The initiative was met with strong opposition from the South African government. South African president Cyril Ramaphosa rejected the premise of the program, arguing that the white minority was not facing persecution that would meet the threshold for refugee status under international law.

By August 2026, nearly 13,000 South Africans had been admitted to the United States, while reports the following month indicated that an unknown number of applicants had also been rejected, in some cases without a clear explanation.

=== Expanding border control and security ===
US southwest border encounters decreased with Trump's second term.

President Trump enacted Proclamation 10886, which declares a national emergency at the southern border of the United States under the National Emergencies Act. This declaration grants him certain powers to be able to deal with the emergency, such as being able to allocate more of the military budget to this. For instance, invoking these emergency powers gives him authority to call for deploying more troops and military equipment to the southern border, creating additional detention facilities, and fortifying the physical barriers, such as the wall – all of which Trump calls for in this proclamation.

Section 5 of the proclamation revokes a proclamation signed by former President Biden in 2021, which halted funding for border wall construction. Similarly, Trump's Executive Order 14165 also calls for additional construction of physical barriers and for deploying more troops to the southern border.

Additionally, Proclamation 10886 gives more authority and discretion to the Department of Defense and the Department of Homeland Security to carry out what is being asked of them. For example, they have the discretion to appoint as many troops as they deem necessary. Going along with their expanded power, Section 3 of the proclamation also urges the Federal Aviation Administration and the Federal Communications Commission to waive their regulations that might hinder the ability of the Department of Homeland Security to detect, track, and potentially mitigate drones or other unmanned aircraft along the southern border that may be deemed a threat. In the proclamation, President Trump claims that, as Commander in Chief, these actions are a necessary part of his duty to protect Americans.

=== Interior immigration enforcement: expanding detention and deportation ===
The rate of ICE detentions accelerated during the second Trump administration.

President Trump's Executive Order 14165, titled "Securing Our Borders", calls for "Pursuing criminal charges against illegal aliens who violate the immigration laws, and against those who facilitate their unlawful presence in the United States". Going along with this, the executive order ends the current catch-and-release policies and replaces them with catch-and-detain practices. Under "catch-and-release", immigrants within the U.S. who have been arrested on suspicion of being undocumented, or for violating immigration laws, but that were not a public safety threat were released while awaiting their court or removal proceedings. Under "catch-and-detain", these immigrants have to be detained while awaiting their removal proceedings. The executive order also calls for pursuing criminal charges against people who aided the stay of an undocumented immigrant within the United States.

Additionally, President Trump orders federal agencies, such as the Department of Homeland Security and the U.S. Immigration and Customs Enforcement (ICE), to prioritize and divert more resources to deporting and detaining as many immigrants as can legally be removed and to building facilities that can hold them while detained. To ensure there is enough personnel to accomplish this goal, Trump signed Executive Order 14159, titled "Protecting the American People Against Invasion." This executive order authorizes state and local officials to act as immigration officers by giving them authority to apprehend immigrants subject to removal, such as those without proper immigration documents. Additionally, the executive order allows the federal government to withhold federal funds from and pursue legal actions against any jurisdiction that interferes or does not comply with the federal government in carrying out these orders.

Further, Executive Order 14159 calls for the expanding the use of expedited removal. Expedited removal is the process by which individuals can be deported without going through the immigration court system, which speeds up the deportation process but leaves those subject to removal without a full chance to plead their case to stay in the United States. Previously, only those who were found within 100 miles (160 km) of the border and within 14 days of having entered the country illegally were subject to expedited removal. Now, Trump orders the expanded use of this practice and any immigrant who has been in the country for less than two years and cannot prove their lawful entry can be subject to it.

Executive Order 14159 also orders federal agencies to stop providing any public benefits to any undocumented immigrants within the United States. Agencies must take steps to investigate who they are giving benefits to that may not be eligible to receive them under the Immigration and Nationality Act, or other laws, and to stop those benefits from going to them.

A February 2026 review of court records by Reuters found that federal courts had ruled in over 4,400 cases, with rulings from over 400 judges, that ICE under the Trump administration detained immigrants illegally. Most of the cases were over denial of bond to immigrants pursuing their cases in immigration court. Per Reuters, "Other cases are pending, have been dismissed because the detainee was released, or were transferred to another judicial district, which would force immigrants to file a new case."

According to analysis from ProPublica the US Department of Justice declined to prosecute over 23,000 criminal cases involving terrorism, white collar crime and drugs in the first six months of Trump's second administration, a departure from the practice of the previous three US administrations, including Trump's first term. At the same time it prosecuted some 32,000 new immigration cases, triple the amount opened under the Biden administration and 15% more than Trump's first term.

In May 2026, NPR reported that the administration was scheduling "massive master calendar hearings" which "include 100 or more people at a time". If people do not show up to the hearing, they receive removal orders. Removal order's based on not appearing in court nearly tripled from 2024 to 2025. In October 2026, the Trump administration had ended Temporary Protected Status for more than one million immigrants from over a dozen countries in the previous 18 months.

==== Bond ====
"Interim Guidance Regarding Detention Authority for Applications for Admission", dated July 8, 2025, "revisited" the executive branch's legal position on the Illegal Immigration Reform and Immigrant Responsibility Act of 1996. The interpretation says that non-citizens in the United States are subject to mandatory detention. Previously, non-citizens in the US were eligible for bond while non-citizens at the border were not eligible for bond. This change led to a "surge" in habeas corpus petitions with federal United States district court judges in the judicial branch (not "immigration judges" who are within the executive branch) siding with the petitioners in "the vast majority of cases".

In February 2026, in class action Lazaro Maldonado Bautista v. Ernesto Santacruz Jr, Judge Sunshine Sykes vacated a September 2025 decision by the Board of Immigration Appeals upholding the policy. In March 2026, the 9th Circuit stayed Sykes' order outside the Central District of California. The order will remain in effect in the Central District. Challenges to the policy are expected to eventually reach the US Supreme Court.

In May 2026, POLITICO reported that more than 425 judges ruled against the bond policy over 10,000 times (~90% of all cases regarding the policy). POLITICO said the policy "infuriated lower courts in ways no other modern issue has. It ruptured the relationship between the Justice Department and the judiciary; pitted the administration against itself; and upended innumerable lives", not just the lives of the people held but also the lives of the families (including US citizens).

POLITICO reported that "Judges bound by the appeals court’s holding have overwhelmingly continued to reject ICE’s detention policy", on constitutional due process grounds rather than statutory grounds.

===== Courts of appeals =====
Map of the geographic boundaries of the various United States courts of appeals

Circuit split
Circuit	Administration's interpretation	Date	Majority	Dissent
First	Rejected	August 13, 2026	Lara Montecalvo; Sandra Lynch	Joshua Dunlap
Second	Rejected	April 28, 2026	Unanimous: Joseph F. Bianco; José A. Cabranes; Alison Nathan	none
Third	Rejected	August 28, 2026	Patty Shwartz; Theodore McKee	Jennifer Mascott
Fourth	Rejected	September 10, 2026	Nicole Berner; Barbara Keenan	Allison Rushing
Fifth	Accepted	February 6, 2026	Edith Jones; Kyle Duncan	Dana Douglas
Sixth	Rejected	May 11, 2026	Eric L. Clay; R. Guy Cole Jr.	Eric E. Murphy
Seventh	Rejected	July 30, 2026	Joshua P. Kolar; Candace Jackson-Akiwumi	Diane S. Sykes
Eighth	Accepted	March 25, 2026	Bobby Shepherd; L. Steven Grasz	Ralph R. Erickson
Ninth	Rejected	July 30, 2026	Daniel Bress; M. Margaret McKeown	Carlos Bea
Tenth	Rejected	June 30, 2026	Unanimous: Richard Federico; Robert E. Bacharach; David M. Ebel	none
Eleventh	Rejected	May 6, 2026	Stanley Marcus; Robin S. Rosenbaum	Barbara Lagoa

=== Designating cartels and other foreign organizations as terrorists ===
On the first day, President Trump issued Executive Order 14157, titled "Designating Cartels and Other Organizations as Foreign Terrorist Organizations and Specially Designated Global Terrorists". The order says "The Cartels and other transnational organizations, such as TdA and MS-13, operate both within and outside the United States. They present an unusual and extraordinary threat to the national security, foreign policy, and economy of the United States. I hereby declare a national emergency, under IEEPA, to deal with those threats." The order directs the secretary of state "to make a recommendation regarding the designation of any cartel or other organization described in (...) this order as a Foreign Terrorist Organization (...) and/or a Specially Designated Global Terrorist". The order directs the Attorney General and the Secretary of Homeland Security to make preparations for an invocation of the Alien Enemies Act and to prepare "such facilities as necessary to expedite the removal of those who may be designated under this order."

Similarly, President Trump issued Executive Order 14161, titled "Protecting the United States from Foreign Terrorists and Other National Security and Public Safety Threats". This order calls for an increased and very strict screening process during the visa-granting process to ensure that those given visas and allowed to enter the United States do not wish to harm citizens. Further, it orders the government to continue screening and ensuring that immigrants already within the U.S. do not aid what have been deemed as foreign terrorist groups and that they do not bear hostility towards the country. If they are deemed a threat, the executive order calls for them to be immediately removed from the country, if already within the U.S., or excluded, if they are seeking admission. If the screening procedures routinely label people from certain countries as threats, the government can suspend entry of citizens from that country under the Immigration and Nationality Act.

=== Laken Riley Act ===
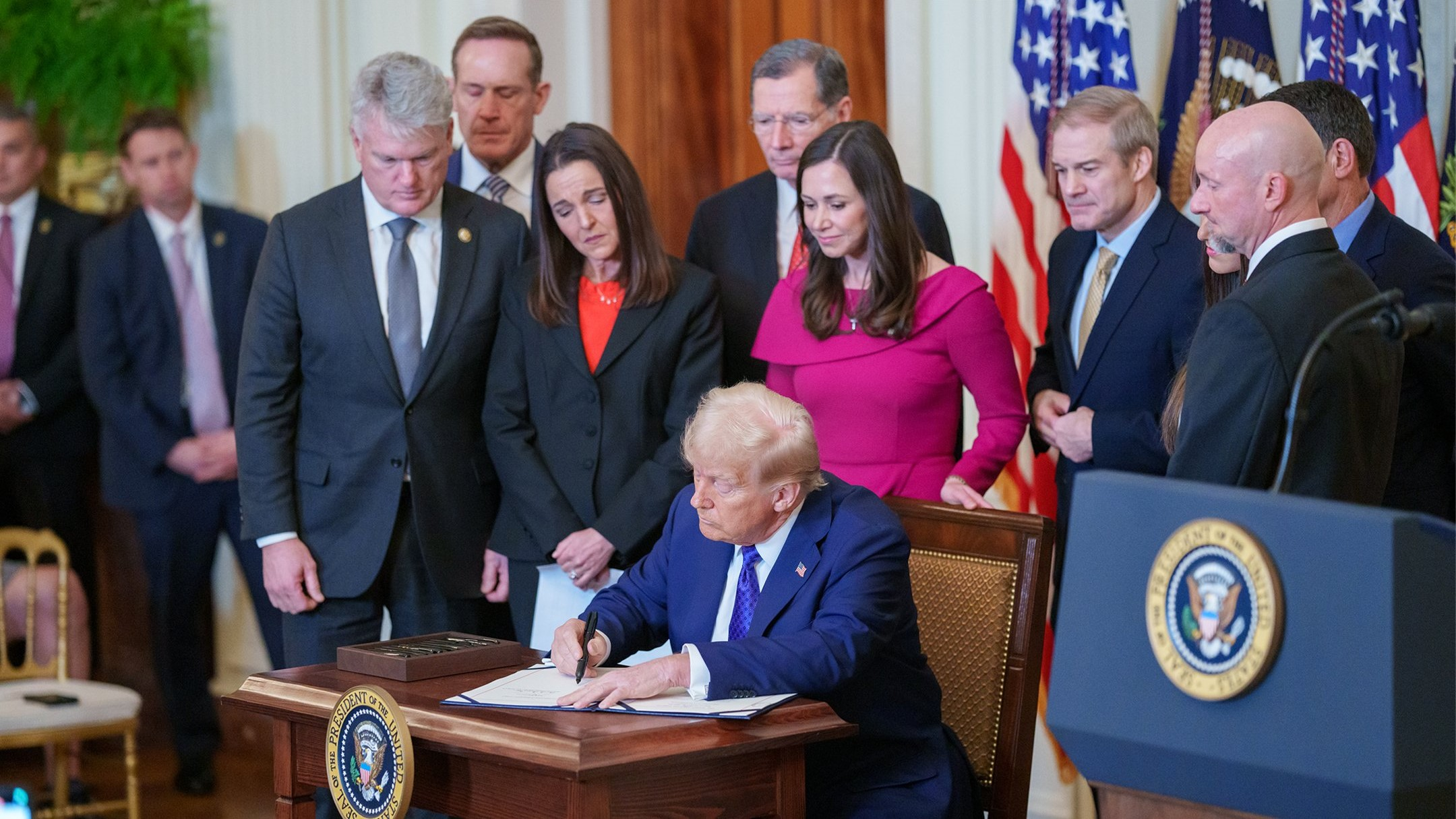
President Trump signed the Laken Riley Act into law, January 29, 2025

On January 29, 2025, Trump signed the Laken Riley Act into law, the first legislation of Trump's second term. The act requires the Department of Homeland Security (DHS) to detain an undocumented immigrant without bail who "is charged with, is arrested for, is convicted of, admits having committed, or admits committing acts which constitute the essential elements of any burglary, theft, larceny, shoplifting, or assault of a law enforcement officer offense, or any crime that results in death or serious bodily injury to another person."

The act also enables states to sue the federal government against United States v. Texas (2023) according to the bill's summary:

The bill also authorizes state governments to sue for injunctive relief over certain immigration-related decisions or alleged failures by the federal government if the decision or failure caused the state or its residents harm, including financial harm of more than $100. Specifically, the state government may sue the federal government over a

- decision to release a non-U.S. national from custody;
- failure to fulfill requirements relating to inspecting individuals seeking admission into the United States, including requirements related to asylum interviews;
- failure to fulfill a requirement to stop issuing visas to nationals of a country that unreasonably denies or delays acceptance of nationals of that country;
- violation of limitations on immigration parole, such as the requirement that parole be granted only on a case-by-case basis; or
- failure to detain an individual who has been ordered removed from the United States.

=== Changes to birthright citizenship ===
On the first day of the term of office (January 20, 2025), President Donald Trump signed Executive Order 14160 to end birthright citizenship for children whose parents do not hold US citizenship or a green card. The order was blocked in court and on June 30, 2026, in a 5–4 decision, Trump v. Barbara, the Supreme Court struck down the order under the Constitution.

The executive order was challenged with at least nine lawsuits on constitutional grounds (related to the 14th Amendment), and as of February 2025, two federal judges issued preliminary injunctions blocking its implementation and enforcement nationwide. On June 30, 2026, the US Supreme Court invalidated the order, upholding birthright citizenship under the Fourteenth Amendment's Citizenship Clause.

On August 6, 2026, Trump signed two new executive orders, 14418 and 14419, again seeking to restrict eligibility for birthright citizenship and ban "birth tourism". On August 11, the American Civil Liberties Union (ACLU) filed a request in federal court, asking that enforcement of the new executive orders be blocked.

=== Changes to immigrant visas ===
KFF Health News reported that the administration had issued guidance to expand the reasons to consider an applicant ineligible for a visa including "health issues or age". In April 2026, new USCIS guidance directed expanded background checks for immigration applicants. In July 2026, USCIS finalized a new rule allowing adjudicators to consider age, health, family status, finances, educational background, and use of public benefits by an applicant's dependents in the green card application process.

==== Trump "Gold Card" ====
President Trump proposed launching a "Trump Gold Card", which is a permanent residency permit that would create a pathway to citizenship for people who can pay $5 million for the card. The Gold Card would replace the EB-5 investor visa program, which is the United States' current path for investors to gain residency. A key difference between the Gold Card and the EB-5 program is that gold card holders would not be liable for US federal income tax on income earned outside the US. Additionally, the EB-5 program requires those seeking a visa under it to invest a minimum of $800,000 and to create and maintain a minimum of 10 full-time jobs for U.S. workers. The Gold Card would change this as it increases the amount of money needed and has not yet specified creating jobs as a requirement. The Gold Card's formal proposals, details, and requirements remain unclear, with varying sources indicating clarification would be required to determine whether: the card itself would cost $5 million, what – if any – the requirements would be for number of jobs-created, or if the dollar amount represents a required economic investment domestically.

==== Green card lottery pause ====
Following the 2025 Brown University shooting, Noem tweeted "I am immediately directing USCIS to pause" the green card lottery, also known as the Diversity Immigrant Visa program. Noem said that the shooter had been approved for permanent residency under said program in 2017.

==== Immigrant visa pause for 75 countries ====
In January 2026, the State Department tweeted that it would "pause immigrant visa processing from 75 countries". (Note: 1. Afghanistan; 2. Albania; 3. Algeria; 4. Antigua and Barbuda; 5. Armenia; 6. Azerbaijan; 7. Bahamas; 8. Bangladesh; 9. Barbados; 10. Belarus; 11. Belize; 12. Bhutan; 13. Bosnia and Herzegovina; 14. Brazil; 15. Myanmar; 16. Cambodia; 17. Cameroon; 18. Cape Verde; 19. Colombia; 20. Côte d’Ivoire; 21. Cuba; 22. Democratic Republic of the Congo; 23. Dominica; 24. Egypt; 25. Eritrea; 26. Ethiopia; 27. Fiji; 28. The Gambia; 29. Georgia; 30. Ghana; 31. Grenada; 32. Guatemala; 33. Guinea; 34. Haiti; 35. Iran; 36. Iraq; 37. Jamaica; 38. Jordan; 39. Kazakhstan; 40. Kosovo; 41. Kuwait; 42. Kyrgyzstan; 43. Laos; 44. Lebanon; 45. Liberia; 46. Libya; 47. North Macedonia; 48. Moldova; 49. Mongolia; 50. Montenegro; 51. Morocco; 52. Nepal; 53. Nicaragua; 54. Nigeria; 55. Pakistan; 56. Republic of the Congo; 57. Russia; 58. Rwanda; 59. Saint Kitts and Nevis; 60. Saint Lucia; 61. Saint Vincent and the Grenadines; 62. Senegal; 63. Sierra Leone; 64. Somalia; 65. South Sudan; 66. Sudan; 67. Syria; 68. Tanzania; 69. Thailand; 70. Togo; 71. Tunisia; 72. Uganda; 73. Uruguay; 74. Uzbekistan; 75. Yemen; Source:) On August 21st, U.S. District Judge Jeannette A. Vargas ruled that this policy was unlawful. In a 61-page decision, she ruled that the policy violated the Immigration and Nationality Act in multiple ways.

=== Changes to nonimmigrant visas ===
==== H-1B visa fee ====
In September 2025, the Trump administration introduced a $100,000 fee for H-1B visas, which allow US employers to hire foreign workers in specialty occupations.

==== B visa bond for certain countries ====
In late 2025, the administration introduced a visa bond program for B1/B2 visa applicants from certain countries, (Note: based on country of passport issuance; implementation dates in parentheses: 1. Algeria (January 21, 2026); 2. Angola (January 21, 2026); 3. Antigua and Barbuda (January 21, 2026); 4. Bangladesh (January 21, 2026); 5. Benin (January 21, 2026); 6. Bhutan (January 1, 2026); 7. Botswana (January 1, 2026); 8. Burundi (January 21, 2026); 9. Cabo Verde (January 21, 2026); 10. Cambodia (April 2, 2026); 11. Central African Republic (January 1, 2026); 12. Ivory Coast (January 21, 2026); 13. Cuba (January 21, 2026); 14. Djibouti (January 21, 2026); 15. Dominica (January 21, 2026); 16. Ethiopia (April 2, 2026); 17. Fiji (January 21, 2026); 18. Gabon (January 21, 2026); 19. The Gambia (October 11, 2025); 20. Georgia (April 2, 2026); 21. Grenada (April 2, 2026); 22. Guinea (January 1, 2026); 23. Guinea-Bissau (January 1, 2026); 24. Kyrgyz Republic (January 21, 2026); 25. Lesotho (April 2, 2026); 26. Malawi (August 20, 2025); 27. Mauritania (October 23, 2025); 28. Mauritius (April 2, 2026); 29. Mongolia (April 2, 2026); 30. Mozambique (April 2, 2026); 31. Namibia (January 1, 2026); 32. Nepal (January 21, 2026); 33. Nicaragua (April 2, 2026); 34. Nigeria (January 21, 2026); 35. Papua New Guinea (April 2, 2026); 36. Sao Tome and Principe (October 23, 2025); 37. Senegal (January 21, 2026); 38. Seychelles (April 2, 2026); 39. Tajikistan (January 21, 2026); 40. Tanzania (October 23, 2025); 41. Togo (January 21, 2026); 42. Tonga (January 21, 2026); 43. Tunisia (April 2, 2026); 44. Turkmenistan (January 1, 2026); 45. Tuvalu (January 21, 2026); 46. Uganda (January 21, 2026); 47. Vanuatu (January 21, 2026); 48. Venezuela (January 21, 2026); 49. Zambia (August 20, 2025); 50. Zimbabwe (January 21, 2026)) stating that otherwise-eligible travelers must post a bond for "$5,000, $10,000, or $15,000" to be determined at the time of the visa interview, and which "does not guarantee visa issuance". The bond would be refunded if the visa is not issued or if the terms are met.

==== 2026 H-2B visa cap increase ====
In January 2026, the administration announced it would increase the cap on H-2B visas "by up to 64,716 additional visas" for fiscal year 2026.

==== Visa pauses and cancellations targeting certain countries and individuals ====
In April 2025, Marco Rubio tweeted "I am taking actions to revoke all visas held by South Sudanese passport holders and to restrict any further issuance".

In 2025, the administration denied visas for the Palestinian Authority's delegation to the UN, revoked visas for Martín Torrijos and Óscar Arias, and imposed visa restrictions on the International Criminal Court, Thierry Breton, Imran Ahmed, Clare Melford, Anna-Lena von Hodenberg and Josephine Ballon.

In August 2025, the State Department tweeted, "visitor visas for individuals from Gaza are being stopped".

On May 2, 2026, the US revoked the visas of five members of Costa Rican newspaper La Nación's board of directors. According to the board's statement this was done without explanation or prior notice. In an editorial the paper asserted the revocations were meant as punishment for its editorial stance in opposition to the Costa Rican government, which had been cooperating with the US on migration and other matters. The board stated that "under no circumstance will these actions change the commitment to or the independent exercise of the journalism that has characterized La Nación during 79 years." Citing privacy regulations, the US State Department declined to comment on the revocations. According to a Congressional Research Service report, the US had previously revoked visas of Costa Rican legislative and judicial officials and former president Oscar Arias over "unspecified ties to China."

=== Ideological screening ===
In August 2025, USCIS announced updated guidance to consider "anti-American ideologies" when reviewing immigration benefits applications.

=== Employment authorization ===
Following the 2025 Washington, D.C., National Guard shooting, USCIS announced it would "reduce the maximum validity period for Employment Authorization Documents (EAD) for certain categories of aliens (...) from 5 years back to 18 months".

In February 2026, the administration proposed restricting employment authorization for asylum applicants.

=== Social services ===
The One Big Beautiful Bill Act restricted Medicaid, Medicare, Children's Health Insurance Program (CHIP), Affordable Care Act coverage, and Supplemental Nutrition Assistance Program (SNAP) eligibility.

In July 2025, the administration rescinded a 1998 interpretation of the Personal Responsibility and Work Opportunity Reconciliation Act of 1996. The 2025 change expanded the definition of federal public benefits which are only accessible to "qualified immigrants", excluding people who are undocumented and people who have temporary protected status, deferred action, and "other lawfully present groups". The revised list adds 13 programs, including Certified Community Behavioral Health Clinics, Head Start, Title X, and may be expanded in the future. The changes have been partially enjoined.

In February 2026, the Department of Housing and Urban Development proposed ending assistance to mixed status households and requiring reporting by Public Housing Authorities of undocumented residents.

=== National Defense Area ===
Location of National Defense Areas

National Defense Areas (NDAs) are military installations designated by the second Trump administration at the Mexico–United States border which are operated by the US Department of Defense, where troops can search and detain.

By declaring a national emergency at the Southern Border of the United States in 2025, the administration has been able to circumvent restrictions on domestic military deployments through the Posse Comitatus Act and congressional approval. The administration is also less constrained by environmental law as it rolls back environmental protection.

=== Habeas corpus ===
The administration "actively weighed" suspending habeas corpus in the United States.

=== Adjustment of status ===
February 2026 memo "Detention of Refugees Who Have Failed to Adjust to Lawful Permanent Resident Status"

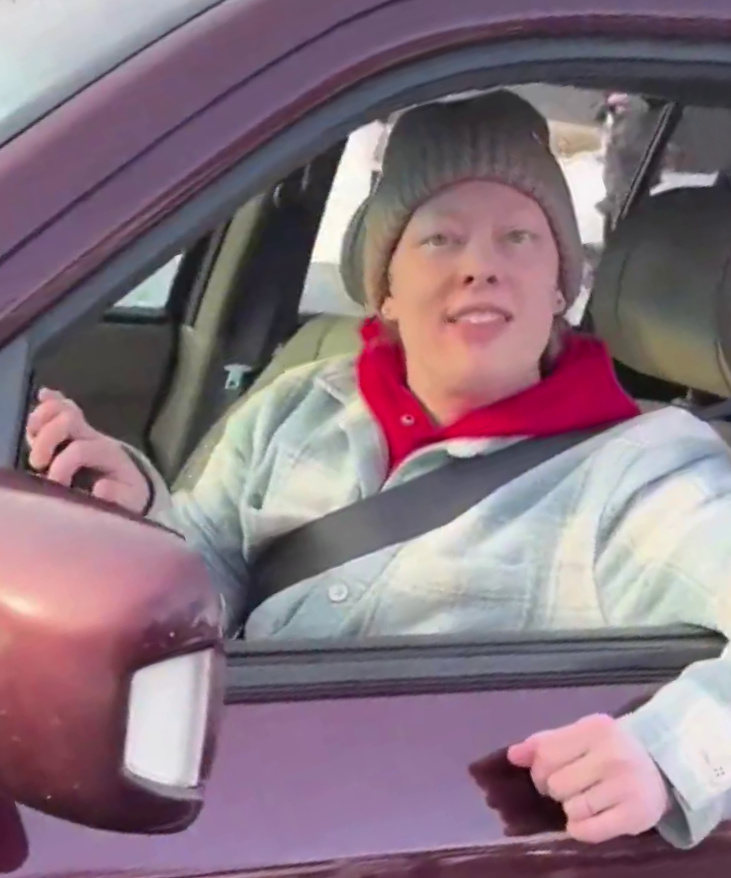
Renée Nicole Good

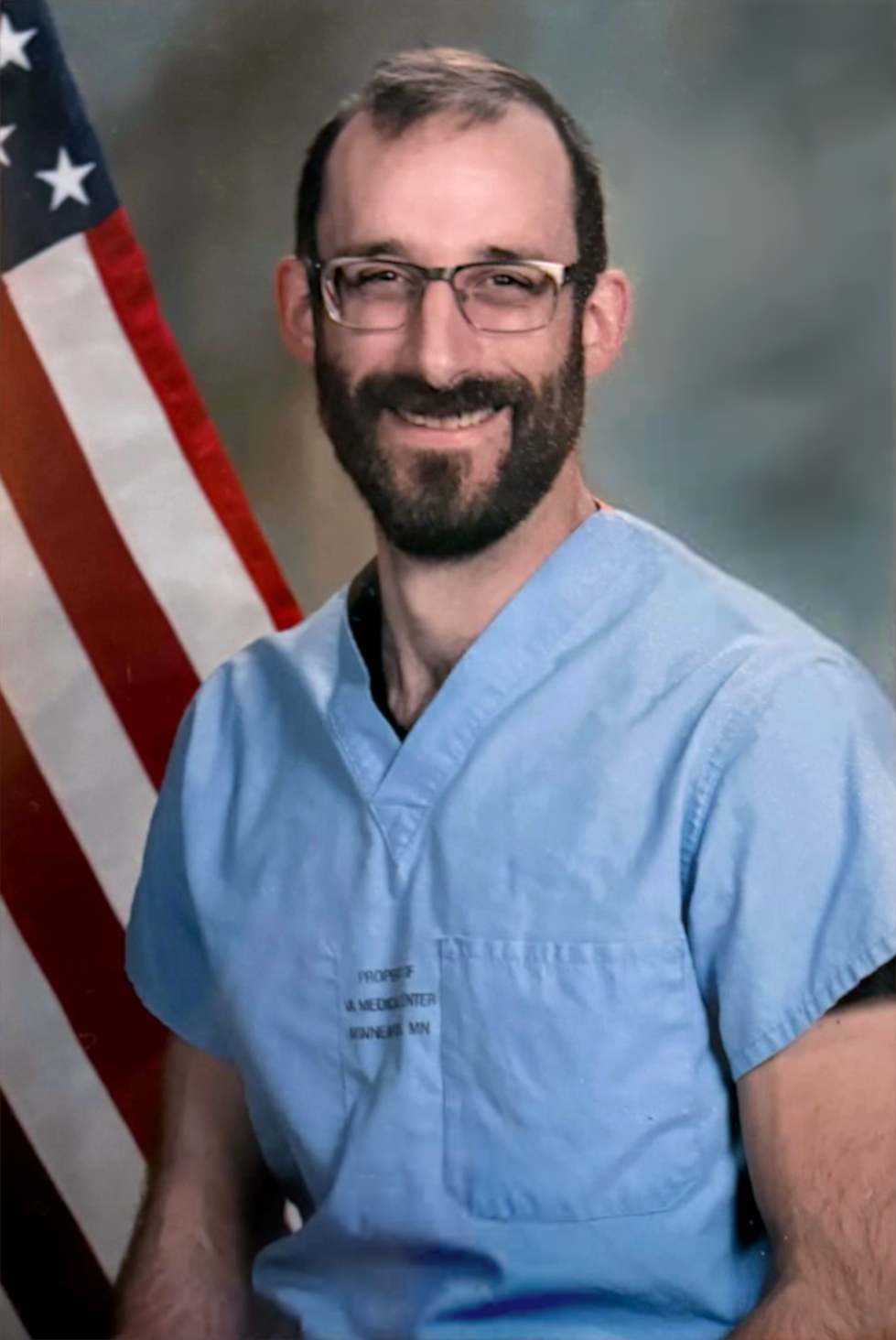
Alex Pretti

In January 2026, federal agents shot and killed two US citizens, Renée Nicole Good and Alex Pretti, leading to extensive criticism of the agency.

A poster displayed at Southwestern College instructing students and faculty on how to respond to ICE presence on its campus in Chula Vista, California.

In February 2026, the administration issued a directive, signed by Joseph Edlow and Todd Lyons, expanding immigration enforcement authority to allow the detention of refugees who had been lawfully admitted to the United States but had not yet obtained permanent residency, as part of a mandatory re-vetting process. The change, was reported to potentially affect tens of thousands of refugees and represented a significant departure from prior practice, drawing criticism from refugee advocacy organizations.

In May 2026, USCIS announced adjustment of status "must" be done outside of the country. USCIS Spokesperson Zach Kahler said the change returns "to the original intent of the law". Under the change, people in the US will be unable to get a green card. Leaving the US would make citizens of over 100 countries ineligible to return on immigrant visas and bar people for years if they overstayed a visa for at least 180 days. According to The New York Times, the Department of Homeland Security later said that the change "was not a blanket change" and that "This was just a reminder to officers of their discretionary authority, which has always existed on a case-by-case basis".

=== Use of data in enforcement ===
Efforts have been made to combine personal data from multiple federal agencies to support immigration enforcement. This included records from the SSA, IRS, OPM, HHS, and others. It has been reported that the administration is using the data to detect visa overstays, identify undocumented individuals, and cross-reference benefits usage with immigration status. ICE has also accessed a database of health and car insurance claims as part of the deportation effort. Civil groups and several state attorneys general argue these practices violate the Privacy Act of 1974 by failing to publish legally required notices in the Federal Register. In June 2025, twenty states filed lawsuits alleging that DOGE's access to Medicaid and benefit data was used to facilitate immigration raids, disproportionately impacting mixed-status families.

=== Workers assigned to immigration-related tasks ===
On September 4, 2025, Wired reported that employees of the Diplomatic Security Service (law enforcement for the State Department) had been assigned to work with ICE on immigration.

== ICE deployment ==
The number of people arrested by ICE increased in the second term of Donald Trump, expanding to include greater numbers who had no criminal record.

Throughout 2025 and into 2026, the administration launched a series of named enforcement operations targeting cities across the country, often deploying National Guard troops and other federal agencies alongside ICE. In June 2025, National Guard troops were federalized and deployed to Los Angeles in response to protests against ICE raids. On July 7, ICE, Customs and Border Protection, and approximately 90 National Guard cavalry conducted Operation Excalibur at MacArthur Park in Los Angeles; internal Army documents described the mission as a "show of presence", and no arrests were made.

On September 4, a multi-agency raid at the Hyundai Motor Group Metaplant in Ellabell, Georgia, detained approximately 475 workers, mostly South Korean nationals, in what DHS described as the largest single-site enforcement operation in its history. The raid, codenamed Operation Low Voltage, involved ten federal agencies and caused a diplomatic dispute between the United States and South Korea. On September 8, DHS announced Operation Midway Blitz in Chicago, a multi-agency operation covering Illinois and parts of Indiana. In October, the National Immigrant Justice Center reported that the government could not or would not confirm the whereabouts of approximately 3,000 people arrested during the operation, as detainees were scattered to facilities across 13 states and ICE's locator system became unreliable. In December, Operation Catahoula Crunch in the New Orleans metropolitan area resulted in 560 arrests; DHS's own data indicated that only about 6 percent of those arrested had criminal records. Also in December, ICE announced the conclusion of the nationwide Operation Angel's Honor, a 14-day operation under the Laken Riley Act that resulted in more than 1,030 arrests.

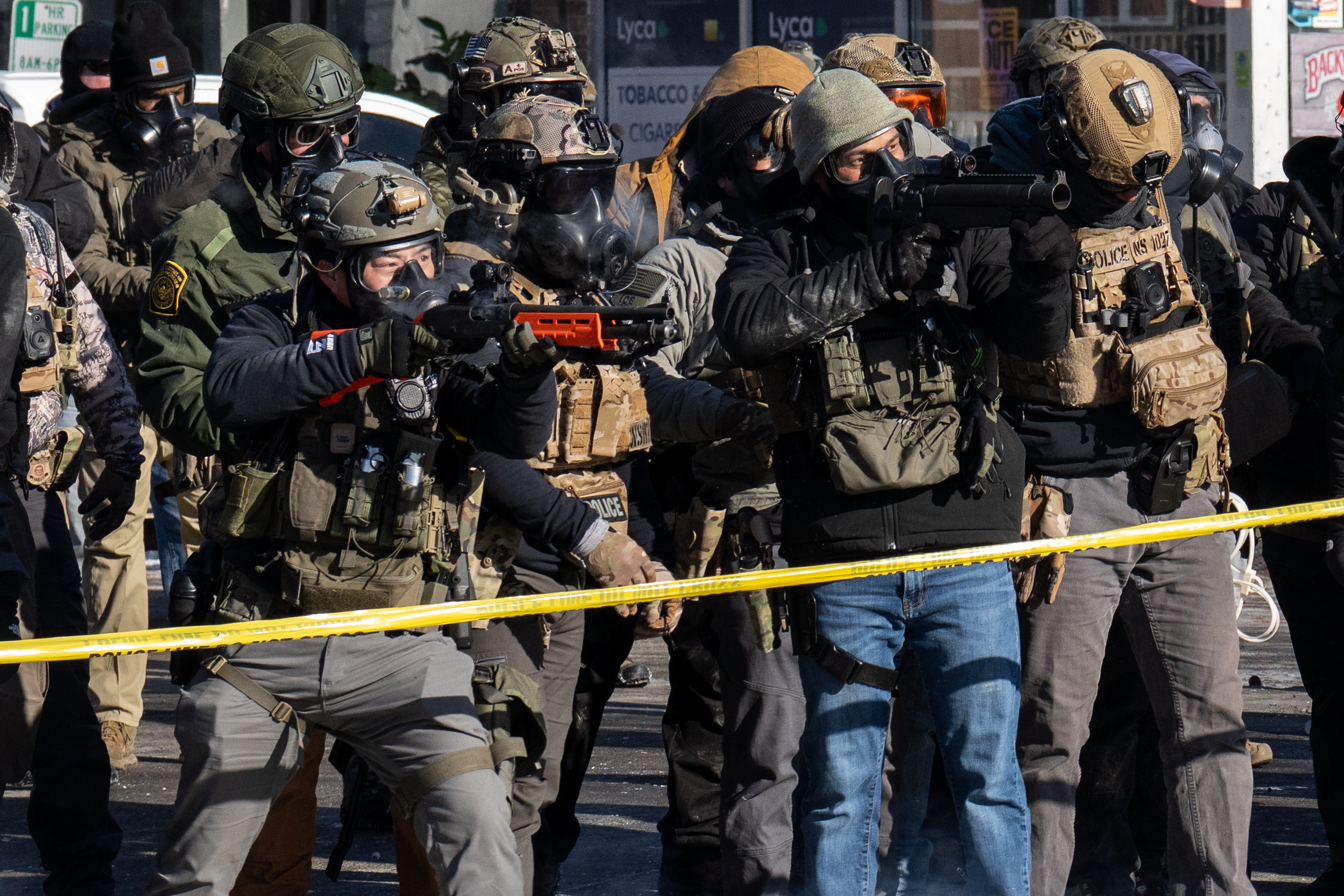
ICE and Border Patrol agents in Minneapolis on January 24, 2026, pointing less-lethals at a crowd of protestors.

Some protesters have been killed or given life sentences in prison, and some journalists arrested. Beginning in December 2025, thousands of ICE agents were sent to Minneapolis in what the government called Operation Metro Surge. The operation drew national attention after ICE officers fatally shot two U.S. citizens: Renée Good on January 7, 2026, and Alex Pretti on January 24. Minnesota's governor and attorney general challenged the operation, stating its primary purpose was "retribution" rather than immigration enforcement. On January 28, 2026, Chief U.S. District Judge Patrick J. Schiltz found that ICE had violated at least 96 court orders in 74 immigration cases in Minnesota since January 1 of that year. In February 2026, border czar Tom Homan announced a partial withdrawal of agents from the state. Additional operations in January 2026 included Operation Salvo in New York City, announced by DHS Secretary Kristi Noem as targeting the Trinitarios gang, and Operation Catch of the Day in Maine, where federal officers arrested more than 100 people in Portland and Lewiston against a stated target list of 1,400. Court records showed that not all those detained had been convicted of violent crimes.

During the first year of Trump's second presidency, as of January 9, 2026, ICE shot at people in 16 incidents (causing four deaths and seven injuries) and another 15 incidents in which ICE didn't shoot but held people at gunpoint.

== Deportations ==
=== Deportation of immigrants ===
During Trump's campaign, he repeatedly promised to commence mass-deportation operations in response to the border crisis and the Biden administration's policies on immigration. Among restoring his previous policies in his first term, his key policy was among economy and immigration.

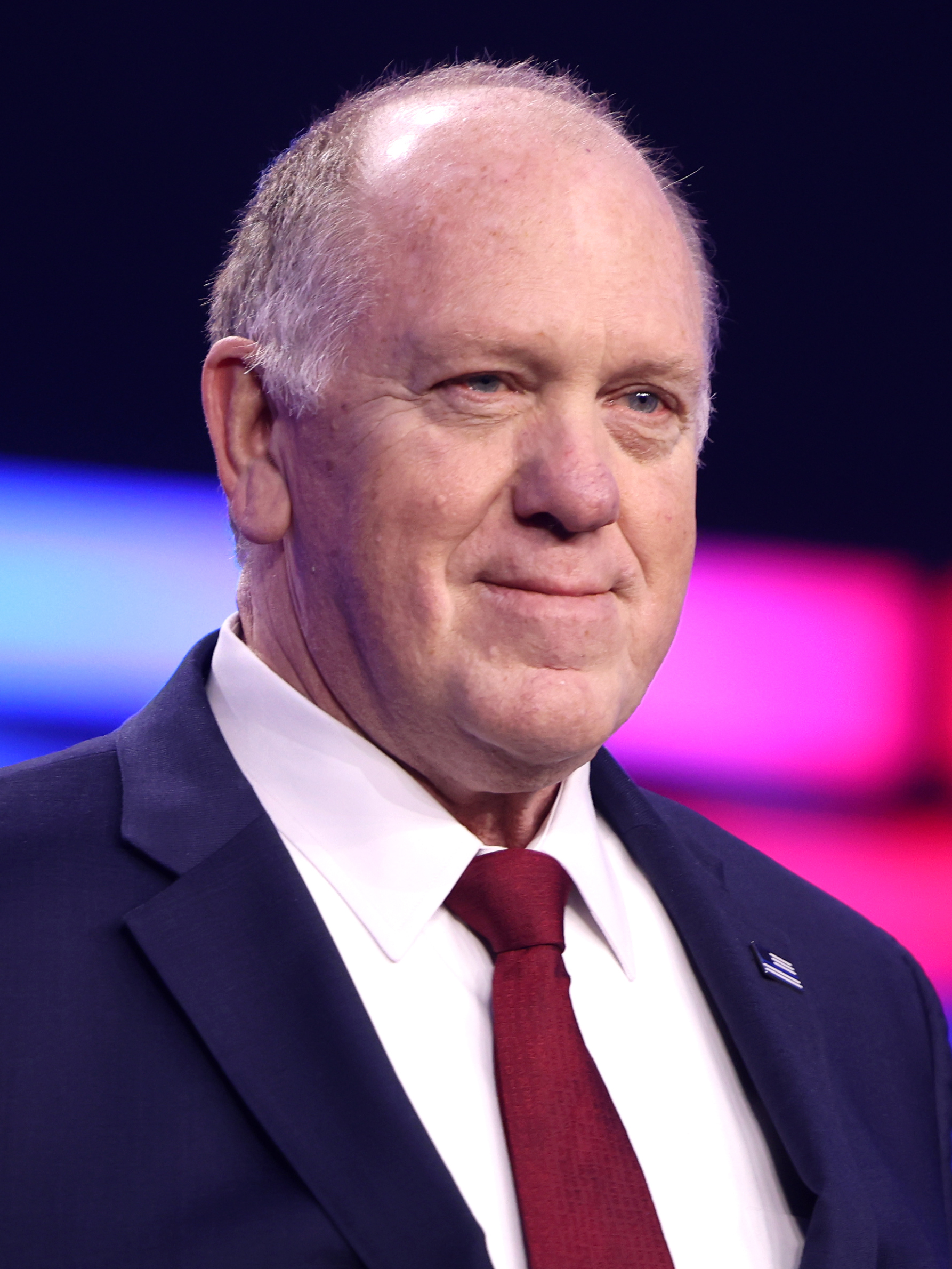
Tom Homan, the "White House Border Czar"

Upon swearing in, Trump appointed Tom Homan to become the incoming "border czar" and direct the Immigration & Customs Enforcement (ICE). With the cooperation of the Department of Homeland Security, ICE began directing raids across the U.S., including major cities where large immigrant communities reside. The administration eliminated the "sensitive locations" policy, allowing ICE to conduct arrests at courthouses, funerals, healthcare facilities, places of worship, public demonstrations, schools and weddings. Homan has been critical of U.S. citizens and others actively using their constitutional and legal rights, and of Americans sharing knowledge of their rights, framing it as "defiance", and said people knowing their rights was harmful to law enforcement activities.

Dozens of deportees captured by ICE were aboard military aircraft, with some being reported to have been held on shackles whilst on flight. Many of the immigrants were deported without due process. The influx of mass deportations resulted in families and communities being disrupted, and contributed to a climate of fear and uncertainty among immigrant communities.

On March 14, 2025, United States Attorney General Pam Bondi issued a directive allowing law enforcement officials to enter the homes of migrants without warrants. On March 22, Trump asked Bondi to retaliate against attorneys opposing the deportations, for what he called "frivolous, unreasonable and vexatious litigation".

=== Deportation numbers ===
During Donald Trump’s first year back in office, the monthly rate of ICE deportation flights more than doubled, and increased to 79 countries compared with 45 during Joe Biden's final year. Destination countries included many outside the Western hemisphere, some of them to African and Asian countries that had reportedly never received such flights in recent history.

37,660 people were deported in Trump's first month in office, including both removals and returns, far fewer than the monthly average of 57,000 deportations under Biden in 2024. CBP has reported a drastic decrease in encounters with migrants at the U.S.-Mexico border, suggesting that a decrease in border crossings could explain the decrease in deportations. The Trump administration has claimed that around 140,000 people had been deported as of April 2025, though some estimates put the number at roughly half that number. On August 28, 2025, CNN reported that ICE alone had deported nearly 200,000 people in seven months since Trump returned to office.

An October 27, 2025 DHS press release claimed that more than 2 million people had been removed from the country, with 527,000 being deported while 1.6 million "voluntarily self-deported". The Center for Migration Studies called the statement "a self-serving fantasy", describing it as based on a flawed interpretation of population data and that a more realistic number was around 1/10th of claimed self-deportations. The Brookings Institution estimated around 310,000 deported and 210,000 to 405,000 voluntary departures due to enforcement activity.

According to a Marshall Project analysis, "The U.S. government deported more than 21,000 people" —including at least 600 children — "to countries that the State Department deemed too dangerous to visit."

=== Detention ===
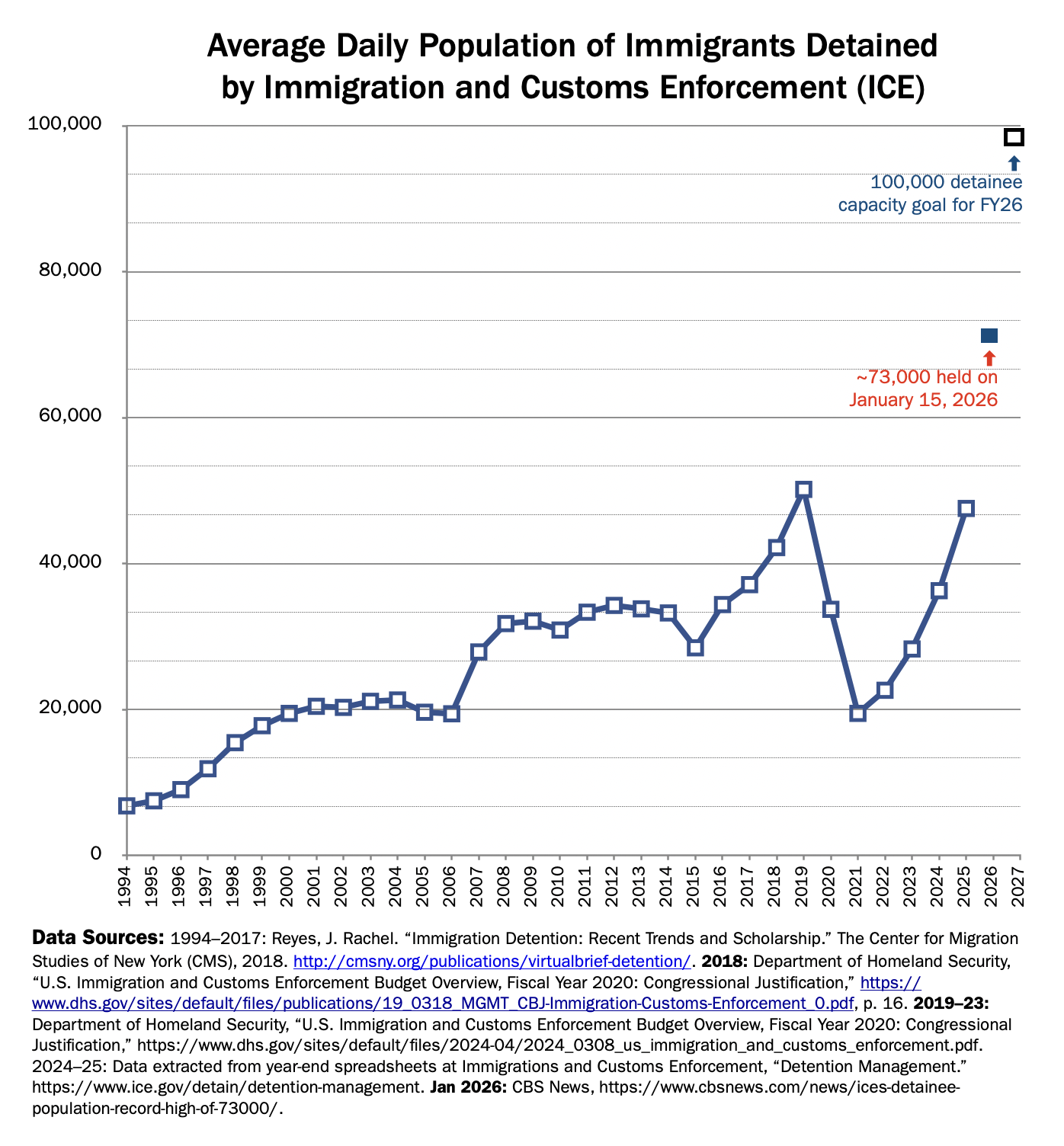
Average daily population of detained immigrants held by the United States government for the fiscal years 1994-2025

The number of people arrested by ICE increased in the second term of Donald Trump, expanding to include greater numbers who had no criminal record.

The second Trump administration has expanded immigration detention in the United States as part of the administration's mass deportation policy. On January 23, 2025, ICE began to carry out raids on sanctuary cities, with hundreds of immigrants detained. The Trump administration reversed the policy of the previous administration and gave ICE permission to raid schools, hospitals and places of worship. Fears of ICE raids have negatively impacted the agriculture, construction, tourism, and hospitality industries. ICE agents conducting raids frequently travel in unmarked vehicles, wear plainclothes and facial coverings, and refuse to identify themselves or present warrants. The administration ordered the re-opening of the Guantanamo Bay detention camp to hold potentially tens of thousands of illegal aliens, but has faced logistical and legal difficulties using it as an immigrant camp. The majority of detentions have been for non-violent matters. Courts have ruled more than 4,400 times that the Trump administration is detaining people illegally. Several US citizens have been detained. In October 2025, around 3,000 people were detained by ICE in the Chicago metropolitan area during Operation Midway Blitz. Government officials refused or were unable to confirm their whereabouts. In July 2026, 49,571 people were arrested by United States Immigration and Customs Enforcement, the highest monthly arrest total during Trump's second presidential term by that point.

==== Use of Guantanamo Bay ====
On January 29, 2025, Trump ordered the preparation of the Guantanamo Bay detention camp to house tens of thousands of migrants.

Within a month, hundreds of migrants had been transferred to Guantanamo. Most of them were swiftly transferred elsewhere, including 177 Venezuelans who arrived in Venezuela on February 20 after having been held at Guantanamo.

On March 13, a spokesperson for the US Southern Command confirmed that no migrants were currently being held at Guantanamo. By early April several dozen migrants "on final orders supposedly to head to their final destination" were being temporarily held at Guantanamo, including Nicaraguans who had been added to a deportation flight originating in Louisiana. The estimates were by the end of March that fewer than 400 detainees had been sent to the base.

==== Use of El Salvador ====
The Trump administration affirmed a deal with Nayib Bukele's government to permit deportees to be held in El Salvador's Terrorism Confinement Center (CECOT), notorious for harsh conditions, at a cost of $6 million per year. In March 2025, the Trump administration invoked the Alien Enemies Act of 1798 and deported around 250 people, alleged by the Trump administration to be members of Venezuelan gang Tren de Aragua, to El Salvador, where they were imprisoned in CECOT. At the time of the deportations, the Trump administration did not identify the accused and did not reveal evidence of the accused being Venezuelan gang members or having committed crimes in the United States.

The American Civil Liberties Union and Democracy Forward sued the Trump administration, challenging the legality of using the Alien Enemies Act when the country is not in desperate conditions, including at time of war. The administration used two planes to deport the accused, despite Chief Judge James Boasberg of the United States District Court for the District of Columbia issuing a temporary restraining order against deporting foreigners using the act. Boasberg also verbally ordered planes containing such foreigners to return to the United States. Trump's "border czar" Tom Homan said that the Trump administration completed the deportations despite the court order, because Boasberg's order was made when the planes were above international waters after departing the United States; Homan also declared regarding deportations: "Another flight every day. [...] We are not stopping. I don't care what the judges think." White House press secretary Karoline Leavitt said that Boasberg's order "had no lawful basis [...] A single judge in a single city cannot direct the movements of an aircraft carrier". Leavitt also expressed doubts about "whether a verbal order carries the same weight as a written order", while the Trump administration argued in court that "an oral directive is not enforceable as an injunction".

The administration has admitted that "many" of those who had been deported did not have criminal records in the US. Bloomberg estimated that about 90% of the deported migrants had no criminal record.

The administration acknowledged that one of the deportees, Kilmar Armando Abrego Garcia, had been deported due to an "administrative error". The Supreme Court ruled that his deportation was illegal and ordered to "facilitate" his return. On April 14, 2025, the administration changed its position, stating that the deportation of Abrego Garcia was not a mistake. Both Trump and El Salvador's President Bukele said they could not unilaterally bring him back. Trump accused opponents of wanting to release criminals. Trump also mentioned his desire to widen the deportations to El Salvador for "criminal" US citizens, asking Bukele to build five more prisons for Americans.

==== Use of Costa Rica ====
In February 2025, the Costa Rican government agreed to receive 200 migrants renditioned from the United States and to detain them at the Temporary Migrant Care Center, known by its Spanish acronym CATEM, pending their repatriation. Costa Rican authorities have made attempts to reestablish custody over migrants who have escaped from CATEM, though others were permitted to leave the facility after formally seeking asylum in Costa Rica.

==== Use of South Sudan ====
In July, 2025, eight men were deported to South Sudan. Only one of the men was from South Sudan.

=== Detention and deportations of dissidents and activists ===
In response to these policies by the Trump administration, many activists and protesters began protesting on streets in major cities across the U.S. against mass-deportations and immigration policy, including Los Angeles and New York City, which are home to large immigrant communities. In spite of this, the Trump administration increasingly targeted legal immigrants, tourists, and students with green cards who expressed criticism of his policies or engaged in pro-Palestinian advocacy. The government has deported or attempted to deport a number of pro-Palestinian activists whom it accuses of supporting terrorists. These include Mahmoud Khalil, Rasha Alawieh, Badar Khan Suri, and Momodou Taal.

=== US citizens ===
Trump has stated "his administration is trying to find 'legal' ways to ship U.S. citizens" to CECOT. During President Bukele's White House visit where the two discussed Abrego Garcia, Trump told Bukele "Home-growns are next. The home-growns. You gotta build about five more places. It's not big enough."

The issue was first raised when U.S. and El Salvador formed an agreement to house people of any nationality in CECOT. Bukele extended the offer to convicted criminals serving their sentence in the United States who are U.S. citizens or legal residents. He confirmed the statement on X, saying he offered the U.S. "the opportunity to outsource part of its prison system". The U.S. government cannot deport American citizens, and Secretary of State Marco Rubio said that "Obviously we'll have to study it on our end. There are obviously legalities involved. We have a Constitution, we have all sorts of things", while calling it "a very generous offer", noting "No one's ever made an offer like that" and that it would cost a fraction of imprisoning criminals in the U.S. He said that "obviously the administration will have to make a decision."

Trump said he was looking into whether he could move forward with the offer, telling reporters "I'm just saying if we had a legal right to do it, I would do it in a heartbeat" and "I don't know if we do or not, we're looking at that right now." When asked about the cost of incarcerating American prisoners in other countries, Trump said it would be a "small fee compared to what we pay to private prisons", that several countries had already agreed to host American prisoners, and that "It's no different than a prison system except it would be less expensive and it would be a great deterrent." Elon Musk called the proposal a "Great idea!!" on X. Rubio in his remarks specified that this would apply to dangerous criminals; Politico noted that meanwhile, Bukele said on X that El Salvador would gladly take former United States Senator Bob Menendez, who was serving an 11-year prison sentence for bribery but who was not a violent criminal.

Trump later suggested on Truth Social that the "sick terrorist thugs" responsible for the recent vandalism of Tesla property could be sent to Salvadoran prisons, "which have become so recently famous for such lovely conditions". Ahead of Bukele's White House visit, Trump confirmed that they would discuss sending Americans to El Salvador's prisons, giving his stance as "I love it" and that he would be honored, but that he'd have to see what the law says, "but I can't imagine the law would say anything different... If they can house these horrible criminals for a lot less money than it costs us, I'm all for it."

Politico cited Insha Rahman, vice president of advocacy in the Vera Institute of Justice, as saying there's no precedent for sending U.S. citizens outside the country to serve sentences in other countries; "It is so beyond the pale of anything contemplated by the Constitution or due process or the criminal courts." Lauren-Brooke Eisen, the senior director of the justice program at the Brennan Center for Justice, told Politico in a statement that the Eighth Amendment to the U.S. Constitution prohibits cruel and unusual punishments such as excessive sentences or inhumane prison conditions, and that deporting Americans would be illegal under the First Step Act, which requires that the federal government send those convicted of federal crimes to "a facility as close as practicable to the prisoner's primary residence, and to the extent practicable, in a facility within 500 driving miles of that residence".

The BBC noted that while U.S. citizens enjoy legal protection from deportation, it is possible for naturalized citizens to be denaturalized. This tends to happen when the citizenship was fraudulently obtained, but citizens suspected of ties to criminal gangs or terrorist organizations, such as Tren de Aragua or MS-13, could, in theory, be stripped of citizenship. They would then be at risk of deportation, although such a move would need a formal court process. Citizens born in the U.S. cannot be denaturalized.

In June 2025, the Justice Department sent a memo directing its attorneys to prioritize denaturalization if the naturalized citizen has committed certain crimes.

== Travel ban ==
Second Trump travel ban Countries whose nationals are banned from traveling to the US Countries whose nationals are partially restricted from traveling to the US Countries to whose nationals the US has indefinitely suspended visa processing.

On January 20, 2025, President Donald Trump signed Executive Order 14161 titled "Protecting the United States from Foreign Terrorists and Other National Security and Public Safety Threats". The order seeks to protect Americans "from aliens who intend to commit terrorist attacks, threaten [U.S.] national security, espouse hateful ideologies, or otherwise exploit immigration laws for malevolent purposes." To achieve this goal, the order calls for enhanced vetting and screening measures for all foreign nationals seeking to enter or already present in the United States since January 20, 2021. It directs federal agencies a 60-day period to review, recommend, and implement necessary updates to existing procedures to ensure national security and public safety.

In doing so, the order also seeks to identify deficiencies in the information needed to assess whether nationals of particular countries pose a security threat, using a standardized risk assessment baseline. If a foreign government fails to provide adequate information, or if other risk factors are present, the administration may impose entry restrictions and take steps to remove individuals already in the country. The order may reinstate and expand upon earlier directives issued during Trump's first term, commonly referred to as the "travel ban".

On March 14, 2025, The New York Times reported that the Trump administration released a draft list of 43 countries that could be affected under EO 14161, which would completely ban citizens of 11 countries from entering the U.S., sharply restrict citizens of 10 other countries, and give the 22 remaining countries sixty days to address concerns from the Department of State.

On June 4, 2025, Trump signed Proclamation 10949, restricting citizens of Afghanistan, Myanmar, Chad, the Republic of the Congo, Equatorial Guinea, Eritrea, Haiti, Iran, Libya, Somalia, Sudan, and Yemen from entering the U.S. The order also partially bans travelers from Burundi, Cuba, Laos, Sierra Leone, Togo, Turkmenistan, and Venezuela; citizens from partially banned countries may only seek temporary work visas. It excludes visa holders, permanent residents, dual citizens, and athletes participating in a "major sporting event", including the FIFA World Cup and the Olympic Games. In December 2025, all immigration cases up to and including naturalization ceremonies were cancelled for immigrants from those countries who were in the process of applying for citizenship.

== Impact ==
According to data published by the U.S. Customs and Border Protection, during Trump's second term, border apprehensions by Border Patrol have decreased, continuing the sharp downward trend since December 2023, and in early 2025, falling to the lowest level in decades. Encounters with asylum seekers and individuals found inadmissible at ports of entry have also sharply decreased.

The Department of Homeland Security (DHS) also claimed that in 2025, more than 2.5 million had either been deported or voluntarily left, although the claim has been called a "self-serving fantasy" by the Center for Migration Studies and other groups who put a more realistic number at a tenth of the claimed amount.

In a January 2026 report, the Brookings Institution stated that the United States experienced negative net migration in 2025 for the first time in decades, which was estimated to be −10,000 to −295,000 people.

=== Brain drain ===
The deportations of lawful permanent residents and visa holders, along with research funding cuts, have made the United States less attractive for students, white-collar workers and researchers. A March 2025 poll showed that 75% of US scientists were considering leaving. Ursula von der Leyen announced in May 2025 a two-year €500 million investment (approximately $556 million) to support US scientists moving to Europe.

=== On Latin America ===
The immigration policies of the Trump administration have resulted in a documented increase in "reverse migratory flow", whereby immigrants (predominantly Venezuelans) originally destined for the United States are returning through Panama. There has been an 83% decrease in migration toward the United States through Colombia while thousands migrate south, often using dangerous alternative paths through remote areas. Combined with funding cuts to USAID, this has caused a nutrition crisis among migrants in the region. In January 2025, Leslie Voltaire, the president of Haiti warned that Trump's policies like blocking and deporting migrants can have catastrophic consequences for the country which "cannot handle the influx". The travel ban which Trump issued in June, may have negative impacts on several countries including Haiti which is already in deep crisis. In 2026, the International Rescue Committee noted that forced deportations to Haiti, combined with nearly total absence of humanitarian help, strongly worsened the already bad situation in this country. In 2025, the country experienced a 20% increase in murders, a 1,000% increase in sexual violence against children since 2023, a 25% increase in gender-based violence, and a 700% rise in child recruitment in the first three months.

As of May 2025, monthly figures for apprehensions on the US-Mexico border showed a precipitous year-on-year decrease in excess of 90% to 8,300, 7,200 and 8,400 for February, March and April 2025 respectively compared with the corresponding months in 2024. Historically, no full year has averaged below 9,000 apprehensions per month since the late 1960s.

=== Impact on children and families ===
A Brookings Institution analysis estimated that about 200,000 children have been affected by parental detention under the Trump administration’s immigration enforcement policies, including roughly 145,000 U.S. citizen children. The study also estimated that more than 100,000 children have experienced separation from a parent, with around three-quarters of them being U.S. citizens. It further suggested that tens of thousands of children may be living without either co-resident parent, while only a small share have received formal child welfare services. Official Department of Homeland Security figures are reported to likely undercount the scale of family separations due to limitations in reporting and reliance on self-disclosure.

In late 2026, after the resumption of deportation, children of immigrant families were brought before judges to argue for their right to stay, often without an attorney.

== Reactions ==
By January 2026, The Associated Press reported that a "broad cultural revolt" against ICE and Trump's immigration agenda was forming across American culture, business, sports, and entertainment. 2025 recorded a 6% drop in U.S. tourism, the only decline in major destinations worldwide, representing a loss of 11 million visitors and of billions of dollars for the travel industry.

In the days leading up to the 2026 World Cup, several human rights organizations — including the ACLU and the NAACP — issued a travel advisory. The advisory warns that individuals traveling to the United States to attend the tournament may face risks such as arbitrary detention, deportation, or other forms of human rights violations. According to the advisory, these risks stem from the Trump administration's strict immigration policies and the reduction of federal protections for racial minorities and LGBTQ individuals. Fans, players, journalists, and other visitors could potentially be subjected to racial profiling, searches of their electronic devices, or cruel and inhumane treatment if taken into immigration detention. The groups further note that people from immigrant communities, racial and ethnic minorities, as well as LGBTQ individuals, are among the most vulnerable to serious harm. As a result, they have advised travelers to exercise caution and to have an emergency contingency plan in place. The ACLU and other coalition members have called on FIFA to use its influence to pressure the U.S. government. However, according to their statement, FIFA has yet to provide meaningful assurances regarding the protection of human rights for all those attending or involved in the tournament.

An Amnesty International report in September 2026 charged the Trump administration with deliberately violating the human rights of migrants, asylum seekers and refugees. It called for the end of mass immigration detention and deportation, racially discriminatory immigration enforcement and unlawful surveillance; protections for the rights to peaceful assembly, expression and association; independent investigations and accountability for human rights violations; and for ICE to be abolished immediately.

== See also ==
- Detention of Juan Carlos Lopez-Gomez - American citizen jailed in Florida under ICE order
- Immigration policy of the first Trump administration
- Immigration policy of the Biden administration
- Immigration policy of the United States
- June 2025 Los Angeles protests
- 2026 U.S. immigration enforcement protests
  - ICE and New York City
    - 2026 Bushwick hospital incident
- Domestic military deployments by the second Trump administration
- Remigration
- Kavanaugh stop
