= Petteway v. Galveston County =

2024 United States case on voting rights

- Court: United States Court of Appeals for the Fifth Circuit
- Full case name: Terry Petteway, Derreck Rose, and Penny Pope vs. Galveston County, Mark Henry, and Dwight D. Sullivan
- Argued: May 14, 2024
- Decided: August 1, 2024

Court membership
- Judges sitting: Priscilla Richman, Edith Jones, Jerry Edwin Smith, Rhesa Barksdale, Carl E. Stewart, Jennifer Walker Elrod, Leslie H. Southwick, Catharina Haynes, James E. Graves Jr., Stephen A. Higginson, Don Willett, James C. Ho, Kyle Duncan, Kurt D. Engelhardt, Andrew Oldham, Cory T. Wilson, Dana Douglas, Irma Carrillo Ramirez

Case opinions
- Majority: Jones, joined by Richman, (Note: Richman did not join section II.D.) Smith, Barksdale, Elrod, Southwick, Willett, Ho, (Note: Ho joined sections I, II.C, and III only.) Duncan, Engelhardt, Oldham, Wilson

Petteway v. Galveston County (Note: In its ruling, the Fifth Circuit consolidated United States v. Galveston County and Dickinson Bay Area Branch NAACP v. Galveston County into Petteway v. Galveston County.) 86 F.4th 1146 (5th Cir. 2023) is a United States Court of Appeals for the Fifth Circuit case in which the court held that racial and ethnic groups may not aggregate their populations in Voting Rights Act violation claims. The decision overrules the court's prior decision in Campos v. City of Baytown (1988). The case was decided en banc.

== Background ==
=== Redistricting in Galveston County ===
After the 2020 United States census was received, Galveston County began redistricting efforts. Two redistricting maps were suggested regarding the county's third precinct; one proposal retained the precinct's majority minority status, while the other reduced the precinct's minority population to the lowest of the four precincts. The Commissioners' Court voted to enact the second map with Stephen Holmes, who represents the third precinct, dissenting.

=== Lower court history ===
Terry Petteway, Derreck Rose, and Penny Pope filed a lawsuit in federal court against the Commissioners' Court's decision, with the NAACP and the Department of Justice filing separate lawsuits. The plaintiffs argued that the enacted proposal violated Section II of the Voting Rights Act by reducing the voter representation of Galveston County's African American and Hispanic population; furthermore, Petteway and the NAACP alleged that the redistricting violated the Fourteenth and Fifteenth Amendments as intentionally discriminatory.

The District Court for the Southern District of Texas determined that the enacted proposal violated Section II, enjoining the country from using the proposal and adhering to Campos v. City of Baytown (1988). Galveston County appealed the decision to the Court of Appeals for the Fifth Circuit.

== U.S. Court of Appeals ==
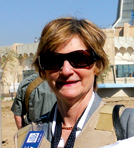
Circuit judge Edith Jones authored the majority opinion in Petteway v. Galveston County.

The Court of Appeals for the Fifth Circuit voted to rehear the case en banc and stayed the District Court for the Southern District of Texas's order. The Fifth Circuit heard arguments for Petteway v. Galveston County on May 14, 2024.

On August 1, 2024, the Fifth Circuit ruled that the Voting Rights Act does not authorize racial and ethnic groups to aggregate their populations in vote dilution claims, overruling the court's decision in Campos v. City of Baytown (1988), citing the statutory text of Section II and precedent in cases such as Bartlett v. Strickland (2009). Edith Jones authored the majority, joined by eleven judges; chief judge Priscilla Richman did not join section II.D and James C. Ho joined sections I, II.C, and III only. Six judges dissented. The decision applies to Louisiana, Mississippi, and Texas, and is expected to be appealed to the Supreme Court.

== Sources ==
- Petteway v. Galveston County, 86 F.4th 1146 (5th Cir. 2024).
