= Marijuana Opportunity Reinvestment and Expungement Act =

Failed United States bill to decriminalize cannabis

Marijuana Opportunity Reinvestment and Expungement Act of 2021
- Long title: To decriminalize and deschedule cannabis, to provide for reinvestment in certain persons adversely impacted by the War on Drugs, to provide for expungement of certain cannabis offenses, and for other purposes.

Legislative history
- Introduced in the House of Representatives as H.R. 3617 by Jerry Nadler (D–NY) on May 28, 2021; Passed the House of Representatives on April 1, 2022 (220-204)

The Marijuana Opportunity Reinvestment and Expungement Act, also known as the MORE Act, was a bill in the 117th United States Congress that would have descheduled cannabis from the Controlled Substances Act and enact various criminal and social justice reforms related to cannabis, including the expungement of prior convictions.

Introduced by Jerry Nadler on May 28, 2021, the Democratic-controlled House of Representatives passed the bill for the second time on April 1, 2022.

== Provisions ==
Provisions of the act include:

- Federal legalization of marijuana by removing marijuana (cannabis) and THC from the Controlled Substances Act and directing expungement of related convictions
- Expressly prohibits the denial of federal benefits based on a would-be recipient's "use or possession of cannabis, or on the basis of a conviction or adjudication of juvenile delinquency for a cannabis offense". Specifically, it would prohibit the denial of any Federal public benefit including federal loans, federal grants, and contracts as well as benefits such as welfare, unemployment, and food assistance—or any "benefit or protection under the immigration laws". The bill would also bar certain federally-funded programs from declining to provide services or financial assistance to an otherwise eligible small business because the business operates in the cannabis industry.
- Creates cannabis tax and grant programs funded by a 5% tax on cannabis products (excluding prescription medications derived from cannabis)
  - Community Reinvestment Grant Program providing services for "individuals most adversely impacted by the war on drugs", including job training, health education, mentoring, literacy programs, and substance use treatment programs
  - Cannabis Opportunity Program providing funds for eligible states to make loans to assist small businesses in the cannabis industry that are owned and controlled by socially and economically disadvantaged individuals
  - An Equitable Licensing Grant Program providing funds for eligible states to develop and implement equitable cannabis licensing programs that "minimize barriers to cannabis licensing and employment for individuals most adversely impacted by the war on drugs
- Directs the Bureau of Labor Statistics to gather demographic data about cannabis business owners and employees

According to USA Today, "[t]he trust funds the Act would create include the Community Reinvestment Grant, which would provide funding for services such as job training, re-entry services and legal aid; the Cannabis Opportunity Grant, which would provides funds to assist small businesses in the pot industry; and the Equitable Licensing Grant, which minimizes barriers to gain access to marijuana licensing and employment for those most impacted by the so-called war on drugs." States would maintain their own laws regarding the substance, including whether to legalize it locally.

Due to reduced law enforcement activity and prison costs associated with marijuana-related crimes, according to The New York Times, the bill would reduce federal expenditures by hundreds of millions of dollars. The Congressional Budget Office CBO estimates that the bill would reduce the deficit by almost $3 billion over ten years.

== History ==
=== Marijuana Opportunity Reinvestment and Expungement Act of 2019/2020 ===
Matching bills were introduced to the House of Representatives by Jerry Nadler and to the Senate by Kamala Harris on July 23, 2019. At the time, Harris was a 2020 Democratic Party candidate for U.S. president.

The act was passed with a 24–10 majority by the House Judiciary Committee following markup on November 20, 2019. Only two Republicans voted in favor. This was the first time in history a congressional committee approved a bill to end federal marijuana prohibition. The legislation was scheduled for a hearing by the House Energy and Commerce Committee Subcommittee on Health on January 15, 2020, titled "Cannabis Policies For The New Decade".

According to a message released by Majority Whip Jim Clyburn's (D-SC) office, the House would vote on the bill in September 2020. House Majority Leader Steny Hoyer, in a letter to colleagues, confirmed that the vote would occur by the end of September. This was later delayed until later in the year as a result on needing to focus on COVID-19-related spending.

Following the November 2020 elections, Hoyer announced the bill would get a floor vote in December. Following debate on the House floor on December 3, a vote was scheduled for December 4, when the bill passed with a 228–164 majority, mostly along party lines, marking the first time a chamber of Congress approved legislation to end federal marijuana prohibition.

222 Democrats voted for the bill, while Cheri Bustos, Henry Cuellar, Conor Lamb, Dan Lipinski, Chris Pappas, and Collin Peterson were the six Democrats voting against. 158 Republicans voted against the bill, while Matt Gaetz, Brian Mast, Tom McClintock, Denver Riggleman, and Don Young were the five Republicans voting in favor. The sole Libertarian in the House, Justin Amash, also voted for the bill.

=== Marijuana Opportunity Reinvestment and Expungement Act of 2021 ===
Nadler reintroduced the bill to Congress on May 28, 2021, with some changes. On September 30, 2021, the House Committee on the Judiciary referred the bill for a vote by the House. On March 24, it was scheduled to be considered for a House floor vote sometime the following week, pending a House Rules Committee hearing. On March 30, the Rules Committee cleared the bill for a House floor vote with amendments related to immigration, studies on workplace and traffic safety, and security clearances. On April 1, the bill passed in the House on a 220–204 vote, largely along party lines. However, the bill died in the Senate, partly due to Democrats not having enough votes to prevent any potential filibuster of the bill.

== Legislative history ==
As of May 19, 2026:

Congress	Short title	Bill number(s)	Date introduced	Sponsor(s)	# of cosponsors	Latest status
116th Congress	MORE Act of 2019	H.R. 3884	July 23, 2019	Jerry Nadler (D-NY)	120	Passed in the House
116th Congress	MORE Act of 2019	S.2227	July 23, 2019	Kamala Harris (D-CA)	8	Died in Committee
117th Congress	MORE Act of 2021	H.R. 3617	May 28, 2021	Jerry Nadler (D-NY)	114	Passed in the House
118th Congress	MORE Act of 2023	H.R. 5601	September 20, 2023	Jerry Nadler (D-NY)	87	Referred to committees of jurisdiction
119th	MORE Act	H.R. 5068	August 29, 2025	Nadler	71	Referred to the Subcommittee on Conservation, Research, and Biotechnology

== Support and opposition ==
In August 2020, on the behalf of a long list of civil rights and drug policy activist groups, Vanita Gupta sent a letter to Democratic congressional leaders calling for a vote on the act. The letter states that "In the face of the evolving COVID-19 pandemic and a growing national dialogue on unjust law enforcement practices, marijuana reform as a modest first step at chipping away at the war on drugs is more relevant and more pressing than ever before."

On June 1, 2021, Amazon's consumer CEO announced the company's support for the bill and that it would no longer test non-transportation workers for cannabis use. Amazon also announced that it would use its "public policy team" (lobbying resources) to back the bill. On June 4, the Leadership Conference on Civil and Human Rights published a letter urging Congress to pass the bill.

In comparison to the first iteration of the MORE Act in 2019/2020, the Act of 2021 had less GOP support. Thomas Massie (R-KY), a supporter of cannabis legalization, criticized the bill stating that it would create "new marijuana crimes" with each violation punishable by up to five years in prison and a $10,000 fine. Senate Majority Leader Chuck Schumer (D-NY) proposed the Cannabis Administration and Opportunity Act that would, in addition to legalizing cannabis, implement a federal excise tax on marijuana starting at 10 percent and rising to 25 percent by the fifth year, which would be in addition to the state and local taxes and additional taxes and regulations. Proponents of cannabis legalization are skeptical that this or similar bills will pass as so called "Liberty Republicans", such as Massie who would support cannabis legalization, have expressed that they will not support legislation that broadens government authority over the regulation of the plant.
