= Judge Garza =

Judge Garza may refer to:

- Emilio M. Garza (born 1947), judge of the United States Court of Appeals for the Fifth Circuit
- Reynaldo Guerra Garza (1915–2004), judge of the United States Court of Appeals for the Fifth Circuit
