= George Bush Supreme Court candidates =

George Bush Supreme Court candidates may refer to:

- George H. W. Bush Supreme Court candidates, the nominations made by George H. W. Bush, the 41st president of the United States
- George W. Bush Supreme Court candidates, the nominations made by George W. Bush, the 43rd president of the United States
