= McCorvey v. Hill =

U.S. legal case

- Court: United States Court of Appeals for the Fifth Circuit
- Full case name: Norma McCorvey, formerly known as Jane Roe v. Bill Hill
- Decided: September 14, 2004
- Citation: 385 F.3d 846 (5th Cir. 2004)

Court membership
- Judges sitting: Edith H. Jones, Jacques L. Wiener Jr., Edward C. Prado

Case opinions
- Majority: Jones
- Concurrence: Jones

McCorvey v. Hill, 385 F.3d 846 (5th Cir. 2004), was a case in which the original litigant in Roe v. Wade, Norma McCorvey, also known as 'Jane Roe', requested the overturning of Roe. The U.S. Court of Appeals for the Fifth Circuit ruled that McCorvey could not do this; the United States Supreme Court denied certiorari on February 22, 2005, rendering the opinion of the Fifth Circuit final. The opinion for the Fifth Circuit was written by Judge Edith Jones, who also filed a concurrence to her opinion for the court.

== Facts of the case ==
McCorvey – who, since Roe, had become an anti-abortion activist – sought to have Roe overturned based on her rights as an original litigant. Federal Rules of Civil Procedure permit a litigant to file for relief from judgment, under defined circumstances. VII FRCP 60b. However, the same rule requires that "[t]he motion shall be made within a reasonable time"; the U.S. District Court for the Northern District of Texas ruled that the time elapsed since Roe (in excess of thirty years) was too great for McCorvey to now file.

== Opinion of the court ==
The Court of Appeals for the Fifth Circuit upheld the ruling of the district court. Judge Jones, writing for a three judge panel, noted that, of the objections brought by Norma McCorvey on appeal, none held up; the district court acted properly.

== Concurrence ==
Judge Jones also filed a separate concurrence, in which she expressed further views. She wrote, "It is ironic that the doctrine of mootness bars further litigation of this case", writing that the Supreme Court discarded the question of mootness (and, for that matter, standing) in order to decide Roe in the first place. Accord Roe, supra, at 171–2 (Rehnquist, J., dissenting); cf. id. at 124–5. Jones noted a substantial body of evidence offered by McCorvey in support of her case, but noted that the actions of the Supreme Court in Roe had created an environment where those materials could never be discussed to any effect. Roe could not be challenged in court (nor, effectively, in the legislatures) because:

[U]nless it creates another exception to the mootness doctrine, the Court will never be able to examine its factual assumptions on a record made in court. Legislatures will not pass laws that challenge the trimester ruling adopted in Roe (and retooled as the 'undue burden' test in Planned Parenthood v. Casey). No 'live' controversy will arise concerning this framework. Consequently, I cannot conceive of any judicial forum in which McCorvey's evidence could be aired...[B]ecause the Court's rulings have rendered basic abortion policy beyond the power of our legislative bodies, the arms of representative government may not meaningfully debate McCorvey's evidence.(Citations omitted)

Jones concluded:

The perverse result of the Court's having determined through constitutional adjudication this fundamental social policy, which affects over a million women and unborn babies each year, is that the facts no longer matter...That the Court's constitutional decisionmaking [sic] leaves our nation in a position of willful blindness to evolving knowledge should trouble any dispassionate observer not only about the abortion decisions, but about a number of other areas in which the Court unhesitatingly steps into the realm of social policy under the guise of constitutional adjudication.
