= Travel bans under the Trump administrations =

As the president of the United States, Donald Trump has taken several executive actions restricting entry into the United States by certain foreign nationals. His first-term travel bans mainly affected 7 countries, all of which are among the 49 Muslim-majority countries; these bans were challenged in court, and were criticized by his opponents as targeting Muslim nationals. In his first term, President Trump signed three executive orders implementing a travel ban. In June 2018, the Supreme Court ruled in Trump v. Hawaii that Trump's travel ban was constitutional.

Most were subsequently revoked by Joe Biden in 2021. In January 2025, during his second term, Trump signed an executive order aimed at developing new travel restrictions for national security. A second travel ban went into effect on June 9, 2025.

== Comments during 2016 presidential campaign ==
On December 2, 2015, a terrorist attack, consisting of a mass shooting and an attempted bombing, occurred at the Inland Regional Center in San Bernardino, California, United States. On December 7, 2015, as a candidate for president, Donald Trump, called for "a total and complete shutdown of Muslims entering the United States until our country's representatives can figure out what the hell is going on." His comments were condemned by several of his competitors for the Republican nomination, including Chris Christie, Jeb Bush, Marco Rubio, and Lindsey Graham, as well as by several Republican state party chairmen, civil rights activist Ibrahim Hooper of the Council on American-Islamic Relations (CAIR), and Democratic candidates for president Bernie Sanders and Martin O'Malley.

== Travel ban in the first Trump administration ==
Trump's first travel ban was imposed with Executive Order 13769, issued on January 27, 2017.

It was labeled a "Muslim ban" by Trump and his aides, as well as his critics, and became widely known as such since the ban mostly impacted countries with predominantly Muslim populations. In addition to the restrictions on entry by foreign nationals, North Korea was the only country targeted with a reverse travel ban, prohibiting American citizens from traveling to North Korea.

On January 20, 2021, newly inaugurated president Joe Biden issued a proclamation revoking the Trump travel bans, with the exception of the reverse travel ban prohibiting American citizens from traveling to North Korea.

=== Executive actions ===
- Executive Order 13769, Protecting the Nation from Foreign Terrorist Entry into the United States (January 27, 2017) – The original travel ban. Travel ban for people from seven majority-Muslim countries (Iran, Iraq, Libya, Somalia, Sudan, Syria, and Yemen) for 90 days, with certain exceptions:
  - Also suspended refugee resettlement for 120 days and banned Syrian refugees indefinitely. Lowered cap for refugee admissions for fiscal year 2017 from 110,000 to 50,000.
  - Blocked by Washington v. Trump on Feb. 3, 2017. Trump declined to continue to defend in court.
- Executive Order 13780 (March 6, 2017) – The second and revised travel ban rescinding the original travel ban. Travel ban for people from six majority-Muslim countries (same as above, minus Iraq) for 90 days:
  - This ban exempted those who already have visas and green cards.
  - Also suspended refugee resettlement for 120 days. Lowered cap for refugee admissions for fiscal year 2017 from 110,000 to 50,000.
- Presidential Proclamation 9645 (September 24, 2017) – A third travel ban that replaced the second one. Travel ban for certain nationals of Venezuela, North Korea, and six majority-Muslim countries (five of the countries above, removing Sudan, and adding Chad).
- Executive Order 13815 (October 24, 2017) – Suspended processing and admissions of refugees from North Korea, South Sudan and nine majority-Muslim countries (Egypt, Iran, Iraq, Libya, Mali, Somalia, Sudan, Syria, and Yemen) for at least 90 days while agencies "conducted a review and analysis":
  - Also suspended processing and admissions of family members entering through the follow-to-join process, while agencies added security procedures.
  - After the 90 day review process, the Department of Homeland Security issued a press release that all refugee processing would resume, but additional security measures would be applied to certain countries.
- Presidential Proclamation 9723 (April 10, 2018) – A proclamation removed the travel restrictions on Chad.
- Presidential Proclamation 9983 (January 31, 2020) – An expansion of Presidential Proclamation 9645 to additional countries:
  - Prohibited certain types of immigrant visa entries by certain nationals who did not already have a valid visa.
  - Provided detailed explanation of the process used to add or remove countries from the restricted list.

=== Court challenges ===
- Executive Order 13769
  - Darweesh v. Trump (NY): filed on behalf of two Iraqi IRAP clients who were detained at JFK airport and threatened with deportation because the executive order was issued while they were traveling to the U.S.
    - In response, the court blocked deportations under the executive order, leading to the release of approximately 2,000 people. The government agreed to reach out to everyone who was denied entry or deported under the Executive Order and who had not yet reapplied for a visa or returned to the U.S. to inform them of their right to reapply for a visa.
  - Two days later, a federal judge in New York granted the Darweesh plaintiffs' request for a nationwide temporary injunction blocking the deportation of all people stranded in U.S. airports under Trump's new Muslim ban. Four other courts also weighed in, favoring the Darweesh court ruling.
  - Washington v. Trump (Washington District Court - February 3, 2017): blocked the executive order within a week of it going into effect. Trump abandoned his effort to defend.
  - Does v. Trump (Washington District Court - February 7, 2017): class action lawsuit challenging the first executive order.
  - IRAP v. Trump (Maryland District Court - February 7, 2017): sued Trump on behalf of organizations, charging that the ban violates the First Amendment's prohibition of government establishment of religion and the Fifth Amendment's guarantees of equal treatment under the law.
- Executive Order 13780
  - Hawaii v. Trump (Hawaii District Court - March 15, 2017): blocked the second executive order travel ban and refugee ban before they took effect on constitutional grounds. The 9th Circuit affirmed the decision on statutory grounds.
    - The Supreme Court allowed the government to implement the travel ban and refugee ban, except with respect to those with "bona fide relationships." Subsequently, the Supreme Court left in place a lower court order defining "bona fide relationships" to include grandparents, grandchildren, brothers-in-law, sisters-in-law, aunts, uncles, nieces, nephews and cousins.
    - The Supreme Court also issued an order that allowed refugees with formal assurances from resettlement organizations to be banned unless they have other ties to people or entities in the United States, pending further proceedings.
  - IRAP v. Trump (Maryland District Court - March 16, 2017): blocked the second executive order's travel ban before it took effect on constitutional grounds. The Fourth Circuit affirmed on constitutional grounds. The Supreme Court limited the Hawaii and IRAP decisions to people with a "bona fide relationship" to a U.S. person or entity, while the legal challenges continued.
- Presidential Proclamation 9645
  - Hawaii v. Trump (Hawaii District Court - October 17, 2017): blocked the third executive order, excluding the nationals of Venezuela and North Korea, based on the likelihood of success on statutory claims.
    - The Ninth Circuit affirmed on appeal, but limited the injunction to people with "bona fide relationships".
    - The Supreme Court let the ban go into effect while it reviewed the decision. The Supreme Court upheld the administration's ban.
  - IRAP v. Trump (Maryland District Court - October 17, 2017): also blocked the third executive order, excluding the nationals of Venezuela and North Korea and those who lacked a "bona fide relationship".
- Executive Order 13815
  - Doe v. Trump / Jewish Family Services v. Trump (consolidated cases - Washington District Court - December 23, 2017): blocked the fourth executive order relating to refugee admissions with respect to all follow-to-join beneficiaries and all refugees from the targeted countries, who have a "bona fide relationship" to a person or entity in the United States.
    - Doe is a refugee living in Washington who wanted to be reunited with his wife and children.
    - The government agreed to prioritize the processing of 315 refugee cases whose applications were still pending because of the suspension and to count any resulting admissions under fiscal year 2018 numbers.

=== List of countries under travel ban ===
The countries affected by the travel ban: All travel restrictions listed below were ended by President Biden on January 20, 2021.

- Chad – The third travel ban (September 24, 2017) prohibited entry for nationals. Ban was removed in the revision to the ban on April 10, 2018.
- Eritrea – The fourth ban (February 21, 2020) restricted travel from immigrants but not on non-immigrants. Suspended issuance of new immigrant visas that could lead to permanent residency. Did not ban non-immigrant visa entries.
- Iran – In the first ban (January 27, 2017), entry was prohibited for 90 days for all nationals. The second ban on March 6, 2017, replaced the first ban and prohibited entry for 90 days. The third ban on September 24, 2017, suspended issuance of new immigrant visas and non-immigrant visas except F, M, and J visas (student and exchange visitor visas).
- Iraq – In the first ban (January 27, 2017), entry was prohibited for 90 days for all nationals. The prohibition was removed in the second ban (March 6, 2017).
- Kyrgyzstan – The fourth ban (February 21, 2020) restricted travel from immigrants but not for non-immigrants. Suspended issuance new immigrant visas that could lead to permanent residency.
- Libya – In the first ban (January 27, 2017), entry was prohibited for 90 days for all nationals. The second ban on March 6, 2017, replaced the first ban and prohibited entry for 90 days. The third ban (September 24, 2017) suspended entry for immigrants and individuals on B-1, B-2 and B-1/B-2 visas (business, tourist and business/tourist visas).
- Myanmar – The fourth ban (February 21, 2020) restricted travel from immigrants but not for non-immigrants. Suspended issuance of new immigrant visas that could lead to permanent residency.
- Nigeria – The fourth ban (February 21, 2020) restricted travel from immigrants but not for non-immigrants. Suspended issuance of new immigrant visas that could lead to permanent residency.
- North Korea – The third ban (September 24, 2017) suspended entry for all non-immigrant visa entries.
- Somalia – In the first ban (January 27, 2017), entry was prohibited for 90 days for all nationals. The second ban on March 6, 2017, replaced the first ban and prohibited entry for 90 days. The third ban (September 24, 2017) suspended entry for immigrants, but not for any non-immigrant visa entries.
- Sudan – In the first ban (January 27, 2017), entry was prohibited for 90 days for all nationals. The second ban on March 6, 2017, replaced the first ban and prohibited entry for 90 days. This country was not affected by the third ban. The fourth ban (February 21, 2020) suspended issuance of new diversity lottery visas. Did not ban non-immigrant visa entries.
- Syria – In the first ban (January 27, 2017), entry was prohibited for 90 days for all nationals. The second ban on March 6, 2017, replaced the first ban and prohibited entry for 90 days. the third ban (September 24, 2017) suspended entry for immigrants and non-immigrants.
- Tanzania – The fourth ban (February 21, 2020) suspended issuance of new diversity lottery visas. Did not ban non-immigrant visa entries.
- Venezuela – The third ban (September 24, 2017) suspended entry for officials of Venezuelan government agencies who are involved in screening and vetting procedures as nonimmigrants on B-1, B-2, and B-1/B-2 visas (business, tourist, and business/tourist visas), as well as the families of those government officials.
- Yemen – In the first ban (January 27, 2017), entry was prohibited for 90 days for all nationals. The second ban on March 6, 2017, replaced the first ban and prohibited entry for 90 days. The third ban (September 24, 2017) suspended entry for immigrants and nonimmigrants on B-1, B-2, and B-1/B-2 visas (business, tourist, and business/tourist visas).

=== Waivers ===
Presidential Proclamation 9645 provided for 'waivers' as exceptions to people affected from the countries who need visas. The waivers were supposed to be granted at the discretion of the consular officers who review the applications of those facing a lot of undue hardship that requires them to be with their loved ones in the United States. For example, if a family member in the United States is dying, a person from the country with a travel ban on it would be granted a waiver to see their family member one last time. However, only 2% of the people who applied for the waiver were granted one. From 33,176 applicants through April 30, 2018, 579 applicants had been granted the waiver.

=== Reverse travel ban to North Korea ===
In 2017, following the death of Otto Warmbier, the Trump administration issued a reverse travel ban prohibiting American citizens from traveling to North Korea. President Biden's revocation of the Trump travel ban did not include a reversal of the travel ban to North Korea. The reverse travel ban was issued for one year, but has been renewed on an annual basis since August 2018. Unless extended again, the ban remains in effect until August 31, 2026.

=== Public opinion ===
Area polled	Segment polled	Polling group	Date	Support	Oppose	Unsure	Sample size	Polling method	Source
United States	All adults	YouGov (for HuffPost)	May 25–26, 2017	45%	43%	13%	1,000	online	
United States	All adults	Gallup	March 9–29, 2017	40%	46%	14%	1,526	telephone	
United States	Registered voters	Quinnipiac University	March 16–21, 2017	42%	52%	6%	1,056	telephone	
California	All adults	Public Policy Institute of California	March 6–14, 2017	37%	58%	5%	1,487	telephone	
United States	All adults	Pew Research Center	February 28 – March 12, 2017	47%	52%	1%	3,844	telephone and online	
United States	Registered voters	Quinnipiac University	March 2–6, 2017	42%	51%	7%	1,323	telephone	
United States	Registered voters	Morning Consult/Politico	February 2–4, 2017	55%	38%	7%	2,070	online interviews	
United States	All adults	CBS News	February 1–2, 2017	45%	51%	4%	1,019	telephone	
United States	All adults	Investor's Business Daily	January 27 – February 2, 2017	51%	48%	1%	885	telephone	
United States	Registered voters	Ipsos (for Reuters)	January 30–31, 2017	49%	41%	10%	1,201	online	
United States	Likely voters	Rasmussen Reports	January 25–26, 2017	57%	32%	11%	1,000	telephone and online	
Utah	Registered voters	University of Utah	January 9–16, 2017	40%	55%	5%	605	N/A	
United States	All adults	Quinnipiac University	January 5–9, 2017	48%	42%	10%	899	telephone	

majority support plurality support majority oppose plurality oppose

== Travel ban in the second Trump administration ==
Travel bans under the Trump administrations
- Restricting the Entry of Foreign Nationals to Protect the United States from Foreign Terrorists and Other National Security and Public Safety Threats
- Type: Presidential proclamation
- President: Donald Trump
- Signed: June 4, 2025

Federal Register details
- Federal Register document number: 2025-10669
- Publication date: June 10, 2025
- Document citation: 90 FR 24497

Countries affected by the June 4, 2025 proclamation Nationals banned from traveling to the U.S. Nationals partially restricted from traveling to the U.S. Nationals to which immigration visa processing is indefinitely suspended

Proclamation 10949, titled Restricting the Entry of Foreign Nationals to Protect the United States from Foreign Terrorists and Other National Security and Public Safety Threats, is a presidential proclamation that restricts the entry of travelers from twelve countries. The proclamation was signed by President Donald Trump on June 4, 2025, with the restrictions being in force from June 9, 2025, at 12:01 a.m. EDT (UTC−4).

=== Executive actions ===
On January 20, 2025, President Donald Trump signed Executive Order 14161 titled “Protecting the United States from Foreign Terrorists and Other National Security and Public Safety Threats”. The order seeks to protect Americans “from aliens who intend to commit terrorist attacks, threaten [U.S.] national security, espouse hateful ideologies, or otherwise exploit immigration laws for malevolent purposes.” To achieve this goal, the order calls for enhanced vetting and screening measures for all foreign nationals seeking to enter or already present in the United States since January 20, 2021. It creates a 60-day period in which federal agencies are directed to review existing procedures, and then formulate and implement necessary updates to ensure national security and public safety.

In doing so, the order also seeks to identify deficiencies in the information needed to assess whether nationals of particular countries pose a security threat, using a standardized risk assessment baseline. If a foreign government fails to provide adequate information, or if other risk factors are present, the administration may impose entry restrictions and take steps to remove individuals already in the country. The order may reinstate and expand upon earlier directives issued during Trump's first term, commonly referred to as the “travel ban”.

On March 14, 2025, The New York Times reported that the Trump administration released a draft list of 43 countries that could be affected under EO 14161. It lists three tiers of countries (red, orange and yellow) whose citizens may face restrictions on entering the United States.

=== List of countries under travel ban ===
- Proclamation 10949 (effective June 9, 2025)
- Proclamation 10998 (effective January 1, 2026)
- Immigrant Visa Processing pause (effective January 21, 2026)

Tier	Description	Affected Countries
Full	Full entry ban: Citizens are completely barred from entering the U.S. under any visa category, either immigrant or non-immigrant. Certain exceptions apply such as Special Immigrant Visa for Afghans or Immigrant visas for Iranians subjected to ethnic and religious persecution in their country.	1. Afghanistan (June 2025–present); 2. Burkina Faso (January 2026–present); 3. Chad (June 2025–present); 4. Republic of the Congo (June 2025–present); 5. Equatorial Guinea (June 2025–present); 6. Eritrea (June 2025–present); 7. Haiti (June 2025–present); 8. Iran (June 2025–present); 9. Laos (January 2026–present); 10. Libya (June 2025–present); 11. Mali (January 2026–present); 12. Myanmar (June 2025–present); 13. Niger (January 2026–present); 14. Palestinian Authority (January 2026–present); 15. Sierra Leone (January 2026–present); 16. Somalia (June 2025–present); 17. South Sudan (January 2026–present); 18. Sudan (June 2025–present); 19. Syria (January 2026–present); 20. Yemen (June 2025–present)
Partial	Partial restrictions: Citizens are banned from entering the U.S. on B-1, B-2, B-1/B-2, F, M, and J Visas, either immigrant or non-immigrant.	1. Angola (January 2026–present); 2. Antigua and Barbuda (January 2026–present); 3. Benin (January 2026–present); 4. Burundi (June 2025–present); 5. Cuba (June 2025–present); 6. Dominica (January 2026–present); 7. Gabon (January 2026–present); 8. The Gambia (January 2026–present); 9. Ivory Coast (January 2026–present); 10. Malawi (January 2026–present); 11. Mauritania (January 2026–present); 12. Nigeria (January 2026–present); 13. Senegal (January 2026–present); 14. Tanzania (January 2026–present); 15. Togo (June 2025–present); 16. Tonga (January 2026–present); 17. Turkmenistan; 18. Venezuela (June 2025–present); 19. Zambia (January 2026–present); 20. Zimbabwe (January 2026–present); Laos (June 2025–January 2026); Sierra Leone (June 2025–January 2026)
Immigrant	Immigration visa suspended: Citizens are effectively banned from getting immigrant visas. (January 21, 2026–present)	1. Afghanistan; 2. Albania; 3. Algeria; 4. Antigua and Barbuda; 5. Armenia; 6. Azerbaijan; 7. Bahamas; 8. Bangladesh; 9. Barbados; 10. Belarus; 11. Belize; 12. Bhutan; 13. Bosnia and Herzegovina; 14. Brazil; 15. Cambodia; 16. Cameroon; 17. Cape Verde; 18. Colombia; 19. Cuba; 20. Democratic Republic of the Congo; 21. Dominica; 22. Egypt; 23. Eritrea; 24. Ethiopia; 25. Fiji; 26. The Gambia; 27. Georgia; 28. Ghana; 29. Grenada; 30. Guatemala; 31. Guinea; 32. Haiti; 33. Iran; 34. Iraq; 35. Ivory Coast; 36. Jamaica; 37. Jordan; 38. Kazakhstan; 39. Kosovo; 40. Kuwait; 41. Kyrgyzstan; 42. Laos; 43. Lebanon; 44. Liberia; 45. Libya; 46. North Macedonia; 47. Moldova; 48. Mongolia; 49. Montenegro; 50. Morocco; 51. Myanmar; 52. Nepal; 53. Nicaragua; 54. Nigeria; 55. Pakistan; 56. Republic of the Congo; 57. Russia; 58. Rwanda; 59. Saint Kitts and Nevis; 60. Saint Lucia; 61. Saint Vincent and the Grenadines; 62. Senegal; 63. Sierra Leone; 64. Somalia; 65. South Sudan; 66. Sudan; 67. Syria; 68. Tanzania; 69. Thailand; 70. Togo; 71. Tunisia; 72. Uganda; 73. Uruguay; 74. Uzbekistan; 75. Yemen

=== Exemptions ===
The policy excludes the following:

- Holders of a visa issued prior to the proclamation
- Permanent residents
- Diplomatic and official visa holders
- Adoptions by U.S. citizens
- Immigrant visas for Iranian citizens facing ethnic and religious persecution in their country
- Dual nationals applying with a passport not subjected to the ban
- Special Immigrant Visas (SIVs) for U.S. government employees and Afghan citizens
- Participants in certain major sporting events (such as the 2026 FIFA World Cup and the 2028 Summer Olympics)

In a video message, Trump said his order was in response to the 2025 Boulder fire attack. The alleged perpetrator of that attack was a national of Egypt, but Egypt was not one of the countries listed in the proclamation.

When the policy was expanded to include 39 countries on December 16, 2025, the exceptions for adoption and immediate relatives were removed.

=== Visa bonds policy ===
From August 20, 2025, the State Department launched a 12-month visa bond policy requiring Malawian and Zambian nationals applying for business and tourism visas to pay a bond of between US$5,000 and US$15,000 in order to deter applicants from overstaying their visas. In mid-March 2026, the State Department announced that the visa bond policy would be extended to 12 other countries from April 2, 2026, bringing the total number of countries affected by the visa bonds programme to 18. Affected countries included Cambodia, Ethiopia, Georgia, Grenada, Lesotho, Mauritius, Mongolia, Mozambique, Nicaragua, Papua New Guinea, Seychelles and Tunisia.

=== Europeans (2025) ===
On 23 December 2025, United States secretary of state Marco Rubio sanctioned Thierry Breton, who masterminded the European Union Digital Services Act, and four other Europeans: Josephine Ballon, Anna-Lena von Hodenberg, Clare Melford, and Imran Ahmed.

=== Responses ===
The Washington Post wrote that the order was likely to incite legal challenges.

The order was denounced by a number of Democratic senators and representatives, including Adam Schiff, Pramila Jayapal, Chris Murphy, Ed Markey, and Don Beyer.

Amnesty International USA called the ban "discriminatory, racist, and downright cruel".

The Council on American-Islamic Relations (CAIR) said the ban was "overbroad, unnecessary and ideologically motivated".

Ahilan Arulanantham noted that while the supreme court allowed the first ban in Trump v. Hawaii on "almost exclusively on national security-related justifications", the second ban "points to visa overstay rates as a rationale" which is "an area of potential legal vulnerability".

Adam Bates, a counsel at the International Refugee Assistance Project, said "For the purposes of terminating TPS, Afghanistan is a safe, stable, secure country. And for the purpose of banning Afghans from getting visas, Afghanistan is a terrorist-run failed state (...) They're self-contradicting." Bates also said "It's just this kind of collective punishment. (...) We don't trust you based on no other reason than where you were born."

== See also ==
- Muslim immigration ban
- Donald Trump and Islamophobia
