= Emilio M. Garza =

American judge (born 1947)

Emilio Garza

Senior Judge of the United States Court of Appeals for the Fifth Circuit
- In office August 1, 2012 – January 5, 2015

Judge of the United States Court of Appeals for the Fifth Circuit
- In office May 30, 1991 – August 1, 2012
- Appointed by: George H. W. Bush
- Preceded by: Thomas Morrow Reavley
- Succeeded by: Don Willett

Judge of the United States District Court for the Western District of Texas
- In office April 20, 1988 – June 7, 1991
- Appointed by: Ronald Reagan
- Preceded by: William S. Sessions
- Succeeded by: Orlando Luis Garcia

Personal details
- Born: Emilio Miller Garza; 1947 (age 78–79) San Antonio, Texas, U.S.
- Education: University of Notre Dame (BA, MA); University of Texas, Austin (JD)

Military service
- Allegiance: United States
- Branch/service: United States Marine Corps
- Years of service: 1970–1973
- Battles/wars: Vietnam War

Emilio Miller Garza (born August 1, 1947) is a former United States circuit judge of the United States Court of Appeals for the Fifth Circuit and former United States District Judge of the United States District Court for the Western District of Texas.

== Education and career ==
Born in San Antonio, Texas, Garza graduated from the University of Notre Dame in 1969, receiving a Bachelor of Arts degree there in 1969 and a Master of Arts in 1970. He then joined the United States Marine Corps, in which he was an officer from 1970 to 1973. Garza earned his Juris Doctor at the University of Texas School of Law in 1976. He was an attorney in private practice with the law firm of Clemens, Spencer, Welmaker & Fink in San Antonio between 1976 and 1986. He was a Judge of the Bexar County, Texas Two Hundred and Twenty-Fifth District Court from 1987 to 1988

== Federal judicial service ==
On February 2, 1988, President Ronald Reagan nominated Garza to the United States District Court for the Western District of Texas, to fill the seat vacated by William S. Sessions. The Senate confirmed Garza's nomination on April 19, 1988, and Garza received his commission the following day. His service terminated on June 7, 1991, due to elevation to the court of appeals.

On April 11, 1991, President George H. W. Bush nominated Garza to a seat on the United States Court of Appeals for the Fifth Circuit vacated by Thomas Morrow Reavley, and he was confirmed by the Senate on May 24, 1991, receiving his commission on May 30, 1991. Judge Garza assumed senior status August 1, 2012 and retired on January 5, 2015.

== Supreme Court consideration ==
Garza was mentioned as a potential nominee to the United States Supreme Court. In fact, he was interviewed in 1991 for the vacancy created by the retirement of Justice Thurgood Marshall. That seat ultimately went to Justice Clarence Thomas.

== Notable opinions ==
- Special concurrence in Fisher v. University of Texas, 631 F.3d 213 (5th Cir. 2011)
- Strong dissent in Fisher v. University of Texas, 758 F.3d 633 (5th Cir. 2014)
- Dissenting from denial of rehearing en banc in Reliable Consultants, Inc. v. Earle, 538 F.3d 355 (5th Cir. 2008)
- Majority opinion in Comacho v. Texas Workforce Commission, 408 F.3d 229 (5th Cir. 2005)
- Majority opinion in U.S. v. Bird, 401 F.3d 633 (5th Cir. 2005)
- Majority opinion in Wallace v. County of Comal, 400 F.3d 284 (5th Cir. 2005)
- Majority opinion in Sierra Club v. Peterson, 228 F.3d 559 (5th Cir. 2000) (en banc)
- Majority opinion in Atwater v. City of Lago Vista, 195 F.3d 242 (5th Cir. 1999) (en banc)
- Majority opinion in United States v. Navarro, 169 F.3d 228 (5th Cir. 1999)
- Majority opinion in United States v. Castillo, 179 F.3d 321 (5th Cir. 1999)
- Special concurrence in Flores v. Johnson, 210 F.3d 456 (2000)
- Special concurrence in Causeway Med. Suite v. Ieyoub, 109 F.3d 1096 (5th Cir. 1997)
- Concurring opinion Doe v. Hillsboro Independent School District, 113 F.3d 1412 (5th Cir. 1997)(en banc)

In 2010, Garza joined Judges Edith Brown Clement and Priscilla Owen in affirming the dismissal of the complaint in Doe v. Silsbee Independent School District. The plaintiff ("H.S.") was a cheerleader who was ordered by her high school to cheer for her alleged rapist, a basketball player named Rakheem Bolton. H.S. refused and was kicked off the team. She sued, claiming a violation of her First Amendment right to free speech. The Eastern District of Texas, Judge Thad Heartfield, granted the school district's motion to dismiss, and Judges Clement, Garza, and Owen affirmed. H.S. was ordered to pay the school $45,000 in legal fees for filing a "frivolous" lawsuit.

== See also ==
- List of Hispanic and Latino American jurists
- George H. W. Bush Supreme Court candidates
- George W. Bush Supreme Court candidates

== Sources ==
Material on this page is taken or adapted from the U.S. Department of Justice Office of Legal Policy, and from the Fifth Circuit Library System of the United States Court of Appeals, both public domain sources.

- Fifth Circuit Library System of the United States Court of Appeals
- U.S. Department of Justice Office of Legal Policy

Legal offices
| Preceded by William S. Sessions | Judge of the United States District Court for the Western District of Texas; 1988–1991 | Succeeded by Orlando Luis Garcia |
| Preceded by Thomas Morrow Reavley | Judge of the United States Court of Appeals for the Fifth Circuit; 1991–2012 | Succeeded by Don Willett |
