= George H. W. Bush Supreme Court candidates =

Speculation abounded over potential nominations to the Supreme Court of the United States by George H. W. Bush even before his presidency officially began, given the advanced ages of several justices.

On July 20, 1990, this speculation became newsworthy, due to the announcement of the immediate retirement (and assumption of senior status) of Associate Justice William J. Brennan, Jr. President George H. W. Bush announced David Souter as Brennan's replacement just four days later, and Souter was confirmed by the United States Senate on October 2, 1990, in a 90–9 vote.

On June 27, 1991, Associate Justice Thurgood Marshall announced his retirement (and assumption of senior status), effective October 1, 1991. President George H. W. Bush announced Clarence Thomas as Marshall's replacement just five days later. After a confirmation process filled with allegations of sexual harassment, Thomas was confirmed by the United States Senate on October 15, 1991, in a 52–48 vote.

== Overview ==
Throughout much of the history of the United States, the Supreme Court of the United States was clearly the least powerful branch of the government, just as is often considered the Founding Fathers' intention, and nominations to that body, although important, were not the source of great political controversy as they are today. Furthermore, Bush's Supreme Court nominations came shortly after the controversial and failed nomination by President Ronald Reagan of Robert Bork in 1987.

== Politics ==
Bush showed less interest in issues relating to the Supreme Court than other presidents before and after him. Upon Souter's nomination, Bush made clear that he had no litmus test for court appointees. "You might just think that the whole nomination had something to do with abortion," Bush told reporters upon nominating Souter. "It's something much broader than that. I have too much respect for the Supreme Court for that."

=== David Souter nomination ===
After William Brennan announced his retirement on July 20, 1990, Bush moved swiftly to identify a replacement. The New York Times published a story with a long list of potential nominees whose names had been mentioned. However, ultimately, Bush narrowed down his list on Sunday, July 22, 1990, to just five candidates, all current or former federal appeals court judges: Edith Jones, Laurence H. Silberman, David Souter, Kenneth Starr and Clarence Thomas. Bush was most interested in nominating Thomas, but he and his staff struggled with four issues surrounding Thomas

1. his short tenure as a judge up to that point (just eight months on the United States Court of Appeals for the District of Columbia Circuit)
2. the fact that Thomas' appointment at that time would mean that there would be two African-American men on a court of just nine individuals
3. Bush was saving Thomas for Thurgood Marshall's seat when he eventually retired
4. both Attorney General Dick Thornburgh and Counsel to President Bush C. Boyden Gray told the president that they felt that Thomas was not yet ready.

There were also challenges involving several of the other candidates on Bush's short list. Gray's favorite choice for the seat was Jones, whom Bush formally interviewed for the job. However, Jones was expected to provoke a confirmation battle, given her active history in partisan politics, her frequent appearances at meetings of the Federalist Society and her work with the Andrews Kurth law firm where then-Secretary of State James Baker had been a partner. Silberman also was thought to provoke a confirmation battle in part because his legal views were thought to be similar to those of Chief Justice William Rehnquist and Associate Justice Antonin Scalia and also because Silberman had joined a ruling overturning one of Oliver North's convictions regarding the Iran–Contra affair.

Ultimately, Bush chose Souter on July 24, 1990, and Souter was confirmed by the United States Senate on October 2, 1990, in a 90–9 vote. The senators voting against the Souter nomination were Brock Adams (D-WA), Daniel Akaka (D-HI), Bill Bradley (D-NJ), Quentin Burdick (D-ND), Alan Cranston (D-CA), Edward Kennedy (D-MA), John Kerry (D-MA), Frank Lautenberg (D-NJ), and Barbara Mikulski (D-MD). Senator Pete Wilson (R-CA) did not vote.

=== Clarence Thomas nomination ===
After Thurgood Marshall announced his retirement on June 27, 1991, Bush considered only two choices: Thomas and United States Court of Appeals for the Fifth Circuit judge Emilio M. Garza. Bush's strategists told the New York Times that all things being equal, Bush would have preferred to choose Garza. And while White House Chief of Staff John H. Sununu strongly favored Garza, Gray and Thornburgh had argued that Garza was "not ready," given that Garza had only been on the Fifth Circuit for a few weeks.

In addition, Thomas had been widely believed to be in the process of being groomed for an eventual Supreme Court appointment since his 1989 appointment by Bush to the United States Court of Appeals for the District of Columbia Circuit.

Ultimately, on July 2, 1991, Bush chose Thomas as Marshall's replacement. And after a contentious confirmation process that involved allegations of sexual harassment by Thomas, the United States Senate confirmed Thomas in a 52–48 vote on October 15, 1991.

== Names frequently mentioned ==
Following is a list of individuals who were mentioned in various news accounts and books as having been considered by Bush or being the most likely potential nominees for a Supreme Court appointment under Bush:

=== United States courts of appeals ===

- Court of Appeals for the First Circuit
  - David Souter (1939-2025) (nominated and confirmed)
- Court of Appeals for the Second Circuit
  - Roger Miner (1934–2012)
  - Ralph K. Winter, Jr. (1935–2020)
- Court of Appeals for the Fourth Circuit
  - William Walter Wilkins (born 1942)
- Court of Appeals for the Fifth Circuit
  - Emilio M. Garza (born 1947)
  - Patrick Higginbotham (born 1938)
  - Edith H. Jones (born 1949)
- Court of Appeals for the Eighth Circuit
  - Pasco Bowman II (born 1933)
- Court of Appeals for the Ninth Circuit
  - Cynthia Holcomb Hall (1929–2011)
  - J. Clifford Wallace (born 1928)
- Court of Appeals for the D.C. Circuit
  - Laurence H. Silberman (1935–2022)
  - Clarence Thomas (born 1948) (nominated and confirmed)

=== United States senators ===
- John Danforth (born 1936) – Republican senator from Missouri

=== Executive branch officials ===
- Kenneth Starr (1946–2022) – United States Solicitor General under Bush

=== Other backgrounds ===
- Abraham David Sofaer (born 1938) – former federal judge on the United States District Court for the Southern District of New York and Legal Adviser to the United States State Department 1985–1990 under Ronald Reagan and George Shultz.

== See also ==
- United States federal judge
- Judicial appointment history for United States federal courts
- Clarence Thomas Supreme Court nomination
