= Carl E. Stewart =

American judge (born 1950)

Carl Stewart
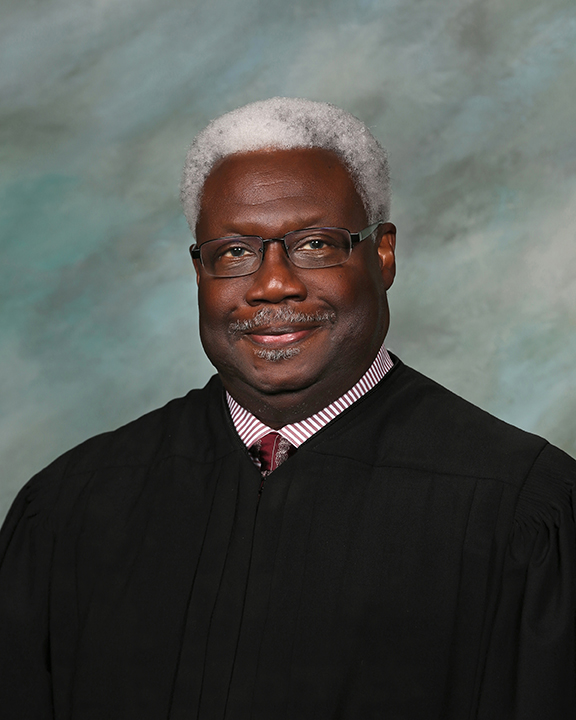

Chief Judge of the United States Court of Appeals for the Fifth Circuit
- In office October 1, 2012 – September 30, 2019
- Preceded by: Edith Jones
- Succeeded by: Priscilla Richman

Judge of the United States Court of Appeals for the Fifth Circuit
- Incumbent
- Assumed office May 9, 1994
- Appointed by: Bill Clinton
- Preceded by: Seat established

Personal details
- Born: Carl Edmond Stewart; January 2, 1950 (age 76) Shreveport, Louisiana, U.S.
- Party: Democratic
- Education: Dillard University (BA); Loyola University New Orleans (JD)

Carl Edmond Stewart (born January 2, 1950) is a United States circuit judge of the United States Court of Appeals for the Fifth Circuit. He was appointed by Bill Clinton in 1994, and previously sat as a judge of the Louisiana Circuit Courts of Appeal from 1985 to 1994.

== Background ==
Stewart was born to Corine, a maid and Richard Stewart, a postal worker, in Shreveport. As a teenager in the 1960s, Stewart witnessed the civil rights struggle of the era, and saw how the legal system could be used to bring about positive social change. Stewart was inspired by what he saw and decided to dedicate his life to helping people through the legal system. He graduated from Dillard University in New Orleans with a Bachelor of Arts degree magna cum laude in 1971 and earned his Juris Doctor from Loyola University New Orleans College of Law in 1974.

In 1974, Stewart entered the U.S. Army in the Judge Advocate General's Corps. As a captain, he served as a defense attorney for soldiers at Fort Sam Houston in Texas. After an honorable discharge in 1977, Stewart worked as an associate in a small private law firm. He joined a field office of the Louisiana Attorney General in 1978.

In 1979, Stewart became an Assistant U.S. Attorney for the Western District of Louisiana, and worked on a wide variety of cases. He prosecuted a loan shark who preyed on the poor, a sheriff who paid for votes during a reelection bid, and an unscrupulous land owner who filed false flood relief claims with the federal government. Stewart received a letter of commendation from the Justice Department for his work on a civil rights case in 1982 and 1983.

Stewart left the Justice Department in 1983 to go into private practice in Shreveport, and work as an adjunct professor at Louisiana State University. In 1985, he won election to a six year term as a district judge in Louisiana's First Judicial District Court. At the conclusion of the term, Stewart was elected to the position on the state's Second Circuit Court of Appeal from 1991 to 1994.

== Federal judicial service ==
Stewart sat on the First Judicial District Court from 1985 to 1991 and the Louisiana Court of Appeals for the Second Circuit from 1991 to 1994. Stewart was nominated by President Bill Clinton on January 27, 1994, to the United States Court of Appeals for the Fifth Circuit, to a new seat authorized by 104 Stat. 5089. He was confirmed by the United States Senate on May 6, 1994, and received commission on May 9, 1994. He served as Chief Judge from 2012 to 2019.

== Personal life ==
Stewart is married to Jo Ann Southall Stewart, a registered nurse who works with school children who have substance abuse problems. They have three children. Stewart's two brothers also are distinguished attorneys: Captain Richard G. Stewart Jr. is a Force Judge Advocate in the U.S. Navy, and Retired Judge James E. Stewart Sr. who is now the District Attorney of Caddo Parish. Stewart is also a lay leader of the Louisiana United Methodist Conference.

=== Awards and honors ===
Stewart has been honored with awards from the Boy Scouts of America and the Carver Branch YMCA. Stewart also was named Louisiana Outstanding Young Man of the Year by the Louisiana Chapter of the Jaycees and won the Black Leader of the Year award from the Southern University Shreveport-Bossier Afro-American Society.

== Publications ==
Published writings by Stewart include: "Contemporary Challenges to Judicial Independence", Loyola Law Review, Loyola University School of Law, 1997; "Balancing Professionalism, Ethics Quality of Life and the Successful Practice of Law", Proceedings of the Forty-Fifth Annual Institute of Labor Law Developments, The Southwestern Legal Foundation, 1999; and "Abuse of Power & Judicial Misconduct: A Reflection on Contemporary Ethical Issues Facing Judges", The University of St. Thomas Law Journal, The University of St. Thomas School of Law, 2003.

== See also ==
- List of African-American federal judges
- List of African-American jurists
- List of United States federal judges by longevity of service

Legal offices
| New seat | Judge of the United States Court of Appeals for the Fifth Circuit; 1994–present | Incumbent |
| Preceded by Edith Jones | Chief Judge of the United States Court of Appeals for the Fifth Circuit; 2012–2019 | Succeeded by Priscilla Owen |
