= HateAid =

German company supporting victims of online hate speech

- Formation: 2018
- Founded at: Germany
- Type: Nonprofit organization
- Purpose: Combatting hate speech online
- Headquarters: Berlin, Germany
- Location: Germany
- Region served: Germany
- Methods: Consulting, legal cost financing, law enforcement, legislative proposals, media and public relations work, advocacy
- Official language: German
- Chief executive officer: Anna-Lena von Hodenberg; Josephine Ballon
- Staff: 55 (2025)
- Website: hateaid.org/en

HateAid is a nonprofit limited liability company based in Berlin that provides advice and support to those affected by online hate speech and hate comments. The organisation is independent and non-partisan. It was founded in 2018 by the non-governmental organisations Campact and Fearless Democracy together with Anna-Lena von Hodenberg and is managed by Hodenberg and Josephine Ballon. Both, along with three other Europeans were sanctioned, by the Trump administration in 2025 for "egregious acts of extraterritorial censorship.” HateAid is an organisation which states to be committed to human rights on the internet and to raising awareness of the dangers to democracy and freedom of expression in the digital space for society as a whole.

HateAid was involved in several legal disputes with right leaning media outlets in Germany, who frequently targeted the organisations financing model and its entanglement with political parties on the left, based on the support HateAid had gained with the Scholz cabinet after 2021, culminating in a 2026 ruling by a Hamburg court allowing the organisation to be called a "Vorfeldorganisation der Grünen" ("vanguard organisation of the Green party").

== Objectives ==
HateAid is a non-profit organisation for human rights online. HateAid aims to strengthen basic democratic values online by providing counselling and legal support to those affected and by raising awareness of digital violence in politics and society. The organisation offers those affected by digital violence in cases of hate comments and other forms of digital violence emotionally stabilising initial counselling, follow-up counselling and, if necessary, financing of legal costs. It conducts civil proceedings against digital crimes on behalf of those affected via a fund for financing legal costs. It aims to finance further lawsuits through the claims gained for damages as well as donations.

It is important to HateAid to improve the conditions for victims of digital violence in the long term. On 27 April 2021, HateAid supported Renate Künast's lawsuit against Facebook for the deletion of illegal content using the example of a defamatory meme. This was the first landmark case against a platform in this form. In the first and second instances, it was clarified in court that Facebook must search for and delete identical and similar memes itself.

Together with the Jewish student organization European Union of Jewish Students, HateAid filed a lawsuit against X (then still Twitter) at the Berlin Regional Court on 24 January 2023. The lawsuit against punishable, anti-Semitic and inciting tweets also includes the trivialisation and denial of the Shoah. At the trial, X pleaded that the German judiciary lacked jurisdiction. The court followed this argument and dismissed the case. HateAid is appealing.

The Dickstinction.com website has been part of HateAid gGmbH since 2022. On this site, those affected are supported in reporting unwanted penis images.

== History ==
In December 2025, the US State Department imposed visa sanctions on joint-CEOs Anna-Lena von Hodenberg and Josephine Ballon for leading what US Secretary of State Marco Rubio called "organized efforts to coerce American platforms to censor, demonetize, and suppress American viewpoints they oppose".

== Clients ==
Climate activist Luisa Neubauer was one of the first people to be represented by HateAid. As part of HateAid's funding of legal costs, she was awarded a compensation payment of 6,000 euros by the Frankfurt Regional Court in 2021 after Akif Pirinçci attacked her in a sexist and humiliating way on Facebook. The money went back into the solidarity fund for victims of digital violence.

In July 2019, Renate Künast was represented by HateAid before the Berlin Regional Court to obtain the release of user data by Facebook. The aim was to determine the identity of the authors of presumably criminal hate comments so that criminal charges could then be brought. The application was rejected in September 2019. Following an appeal by Künast to the Berlin Court of Appeal, the Regional Court amended its ruling to the effect that 6 of the 22 comments were now classified as insults. In October 2022, the Federal Constitutional Court also deemed the remaining comments to be insults punishable under Section 185 StGB. In November 2022, the Berlin Court of Appeal recognised all 22 comments as criminal offences.

Cultural studies scholar Madita Oeming also found support at HateAid. In August 2019, she posted on Twitter that she had received a teaching assignment from the FU Berlin and would be holding a seminar entitled Porn in the USA. A retweet with a derogatory comment by Beatrix von Storch was seen by 250,000 users and Oeming experienced an intense backlash for two days.

Igor Levit, Nicole Diekmann, Louisa Dellert, Gollaleh Ahmadi and the Elevator Boys are other clients of HateAid who are in the public eye and speak out in public as affected persons.

However, HateAid not only supports celebrities, but all people who do not spread hate themselves. In 2024, the HateAid team supported 1,877 victims in 7,688 incidents. In 2024, HateAid funded 326 criminal charges, 143 warnings and 49 civil lawsuits.

== Funding ==
The founding of HateAid was supported by the Robert Bosch Stiftung.

In 2024, funding consisted of private (58.3%) and public funding (25.2%), free donations (13.2%) and other income such as fines (3.3%).

The largest donations in 2024 came from the Alfred Landecker Foundation, the Federal Ministry for Family Affairs, Senior Citizens, Women and Youth and the Federal Ministry of Justice. HateAid is also supported by well-known sponsors: Journalists Boris Herrmann and Nico Fried, for example, donated their prize money from the Bundestag Media Prize, and lawyer Chan-jo Jun donated his prize money from the Max Dortu Prize for Civil Courage and Lived Democracy of the regional capital Potsdam.

== Awards ==
HateAid is the recipient of the Theodor Heuss Medal 2023, the Rothenburg Prize for Remembrance and Future, the Values Prize for Democracy from the Values Foundation and the For.Net Award from the Technical University of Munich.

== Media ==
In 2021, The New York Times reported that leading up to the German September 26 election, HateAid stated online hate speech had increased pronouncedly, such as political candidate Laura Dornheim discovering a torrent of abuse thrown at her via her social media feed, including threats to kill or assault her sexually. HateAid was also fighting for tougher laws.
