= Edith Jones =

American judge (born 1949)

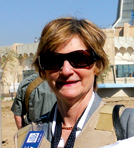

Chief Judge of the United States Court of Appeals for the Fifth Circuit
- In office January 30, 2006 – October 1, 2012
- Preceded by: Carolyn Dineen King
- Succeeded by: Carl E. Stewart

Judge of the United States Court of Appeals for the Fifth Circuit
- Incumbent
- Assumed office April 4, 1985
- Appointed by: Ronald Reagan
- Preceded by: Seat established

Personal details
- Born: April 7, 1949 (age 77) Philadelphia, Pennsylvania, U.S.
- Education: Cornell University (BA); University of Texas, Austin (JD)

Edith Hollan Jones (née Hollan; born April 7, 1949) is a United States circuit judge and the former chief judge of the United States Court of Appeals for the Fifth Circuit.

Jones was nominated by President Ronald Reagan on February 27, 1985, to a new seat created by 98 Stat. 333. She was confirmed by the United States Senate on April 3, 1985, and received commission on April 4, 1985. Jones served as chief judge of the Fifth Circuit from 2006 to 2012.

== Education and career ==
Born in Philadelphia, Pennsylvania, Jones graduated from Cornell University with a Bachelor of Arts in economics in 1971. She received her Juris Doctor from University of Texas School of Law in 1974, where she was a member of the Texas Law Review. She was in private practice in Houston, Texas, from 1974 until 1985, working for the firm of Andrews, Kurth, Campbell & Jones, where she became the firm's first female partner. She specialized in bankruptcy law. She also served as general counsel for the Republican Party of Texas from 1982 to 1983.

== Federal judicial service ==
Jones was nominated by President Ronald Reagan on February 27, 1985, to the United States Court of Appeals for the Fifth Circuit, to a new seat authorized by 98 Stat. 333. She was confirmed by the United States Senate on April 3, 1985, and received commission on April 4, 1985, at the age of 35. She served as chief judge from January 16, 2006, to October 1, 2012, succeeding Carolyn Dineen King.

== Other service ==
She sits on the board of directors of the Boy Scouts of America and the Garland Walker American Inns of Court.

In 2010, Jones visited Iraq as part of the U.S. State Department's Rule of Law program, where she advised and encouraged Iraqi and Kurdish judges.

== Supreme Court consideration ==
Jones has been mentioned frequently as being on the list of potential nominees to the Supreme Court of the United States. A 1990 report from The New York Times cited her as George H. W. Bush's second choice for the Supreme Court vacancy filled by Justice David Souter. The Chicago Sun-Times and several other newspapers reported on July 1, 2005, that she had also been considered for nomination to the Supreme Court during the presidency of George W. Bush.

== Legal philosophy ==
In her opinions, she has questioned the legal reasoning which legalized abortion, advocated streamlining death penalty cases, invalidated a federal ban on possession of machine guns and advocated toughening bankruptcy laws. In 2006, Jones found that a death row inmate who had filed a pro se motion to drop his appeal while his attorney was abroad could not later reinstate his appeal.

In June 2017, Jones dissented when the court found that a university did not violate the Due Process Clause or Title IX when it expelled a student for committing a campus sexual assault and his girlfriend, who had recorded the assault and shared the video on social media. In May 2018, Jones wrote for the court when it found that Texas Senate Bill 4, which prohibits local governments or public employees from "endorsing" sanctuary city policies, did not violate the First Amendment.

=== McCorvey v. Hill ===
Jones attracted attention for her opinion in the case of McCorvey v. Hill (2004), which was a request by Norma McCorvey – the 'Jane Roe' of Roe v. Wade – to vacate the finding of that case. Jones joined the Fifth Circuit in rejecting the petition on procedural grounds, but she took the unusual step of handing down a six-page concurrence to the judgment of the court.

The concurrence credited the evidence presented by McCorvey and sharply criticized the Supreme Court's rulings in Roe and in a less famous case that was decided simultaneously, Doe v. Bolton. She quoted Justice Byron White's dissent in the latter that described the Supreme Court's decision as an "exercise of raw judicial power". She concluded: "That the court's constitutional decision making leaves our nation in a position of willful blindness to evolving knowledge should trouble any dispassionate observer not only about the abortion decisions, but about a number of other areas in which the court unhesitatingly steps into the realm of social policy under the guise of constitutional adjudication."

== Controversy ==
In 2011, Jones yelled at her colleague James L. Dennis during an oral argument, telling him to "shut up." She later apologized for her "inappropriate language" and stated that Dennis accepted her apology.

A group of civil rights organizations and legal ethicists filed a complaint of misconduct against Jones on June 4, 2013, after she had allegedly said that "racial groups like African-Americans and Hispanics are predisposed to crime" and are "prone to commit acts of violence" that are more "heinous" than members of other ethnic groups. According to the complaint, Jones also stated that a death sentence is a service to defendants because it allows them to make peace with God and that she "referred to her personal religious views as justification for the death penalty." Jones allegedly made the remarks during a speech to the University of Pennsylvania Federalist Society. However, the speech was not recorded, and the ethics complaint was based solely on affidavits from audience members.

In part because Jones had recently served as the chief judge of the Fifth Circuit, Chief Justice of the United States John Roberts, in his administrative capacity, transferred the complaints to the judicial ethics panel of the United States Court of Appeals for the District of Columbia Circuit.

On August 12, 2014, the judicial ethics panel of the District of Columbia Circuit dismissed the complaint by citing lack of evidence to justify disciplining Jones. The complainants appealed to the Judicial Conference of the United States, which affirmed the ruling of the judicial ethics panel in February 2015.

In August 2023, Jones wrote a letter published in The Wall Street Journal criticizing a complaint brought by the chief judge of the United States Court of Appeals for the Federal Circuit against fellow circuit judge Pauline Newman. Jones stated that the refusal of the circuit to transfer the case to another circuit for review, and to instead to have the same judges act as "prosecutors, judges, jurors and witnesses", as "inexplicable".

In 2024, Jones described criticism of court-shopping (the practice of selectively filing cases in jurisdictions where favorable rulings are expected) as "attacks on the judiciary" and "ultimately attacks on the rule of law." Several Texas trial courts within the Fifth Circuit, for which Jones was formerly chief judge, have been widely described as rife with court-shopping, as conservative litigants file cases in select courts where Republican-appointed judges give favorable rulings.

== See also ==
- George H. W. Bush Supreme Court candidates
- George W. Bush Supreme Court candidates
- List of United States federal judges by longevity of service

Legal offices
New seat	Judge of the United States Court of Appeals for the Fifth Circuit; 1985–present	Incumbent
Preceded by Carolyn Dineen King	Chief Judge of the United States Court of Appeals for the Fifth Circuit; 2006–2012	Succeeded by Carl E. Stewart
