= Federal public benefit =

Legal term

Federal public benefit is a legal term of art in the United States. It is defined by 8 U.S.C. § 1611 which defines it as "(A) any grant, contract, loan, professional license, or commercial license provided by an agency of the United States or by appropriated funds of the United States; and (B) any retirement, welfare, health, disability, public or assisted housing, postsecondary education, food assistance, unemployment benefit, or any other similar benefit for which payments or assistance are provided to an individual, household, or family eligibility unit by an agency of the United States or by appropriated funds of the United States."
