= Illegal Immigration Reform and Immigrant Responsibility Act of 1996 =

US federal immigration legislation

- Long title: Division C of "An Act making omnibus consolidated appropriations for the fiscal year ending September 30, 1997, and for other purposes".
- Acronyms (colloquial): IIRAIRA
- Enacted by: the 104th United States Congress
- Effective: April 1, 1997

Citations
- Public law: Pub. L. 104–208 (text) (PDF)
- Statutes at Large: 110 Stat. 3009-546

Codification
- Acts amended: Immigration and Nationality Act of 1952; Antiterrorism and Effective Death Penalty Act of 1996; Immigration and Nationality Technical Corrections Act of 1994; Immigration Act of 1990; Anti-Drug Abuse Act of 1988
- Titles amended: 8 U.S.C.: Aliens and Nationality
- U.S.C. sections amended: 8 U.S.C. ch. 12, subch. I § 1101 et seq.; 8 U.S.C. ch. 12, subch. II § 1221 et seq.; 8 U.S.C. ch. 12, subch. II § 1324; 8 U.S.C. ch. 12, subch. II § 1363a

Legislative history
- Introduced in the House as H.R. 3610 by C. W. Bill Young (R-FL) on June 11, 1996; Committee consideration by House Appropriations, Senate Appropriations, House Judiciary; Passed the House on June 13, 1996 (278–126, Roll call vote 247, via Clerk.House.gov); Passed the Senate on July 18, 1996 (72–27, Roll call vote 200, via Senate.gov, in lieu of S. 1894); Reported by the joint conference committee on September 28, 1996; agreed to by the House on September 28, 1996 (370–37, Roll call vote 455, via Clerk.House.gov) and by the Senate on September 30, 1996 (Agreed voice vote); Signed into law by President Bill Clinton on September 30, 1996

United States Supreme Court cases
- List: Immigration and Naturalization Service v. St. Cyr, 533 U.S. 289 (2001); Zadvydas v. Davis, 533 U.S. 678 (2001); Demore v. Kim, 538 U.S. 510 (2003); Fernandez-Vargas v. Gonzales, 548 U.S. 30 (2006); Vartelas v. Holder, 566 U.S. 257 (2012); Jennings v. Rodriguez, No. 15-1204, 583 U.S. ___ (2018); Pereira v. Sessions, No. 17-459, 585 U.S. ___ (2018); Nielsen v. Preap, No. 16-1363, 586 U.S. ___ (2019); Nasrallah v. Barr, No. 18-1432, 590 U.S. ___ (2020); Department of Homeland Security v. Thuraissigiam, No. 19-161, 591 U.S. ___ (2020); Niz-Chavez v. Garland, No. 19-863, 593 U.S. ___ (2021); Johnson v. Guzman Chavez, No. 19-897, 594 U.S. ___ (2021); Patel v. Garland, No. 20-979, 596 U.S. ___ (2022); Garland v. Gonzalez, No. 20-322, 596 U.S. ___ (2022); Johnson v. Arteaga-Martinez, No. 19-896, 596 U.S. ___ (2022); Biden v. Texas, No. 21-954, 597 U.S. ___ (2022); United States v. Texas, No. 22-58, 599 U.S. ___ (2023)

The Illegal Immigration Reform and Immigrant Responsibility Act of 1996 (IIRAIRA), is a law enacted as division C of the Omnibus Consolidated Appropriations Act of 1997 which made major changes to the Immigration and Nationality Act of 1952 (INA). IIRAIRA's changes became effective on April 1, 1997.

Former United States President Bill Clinton asserted that the legislation strengthened "the rule of law by cracking down on illegal immigration at the border, in the workplace, and in the criminal justice system—without punishing those living in the United States legally". However, IIRAIRA has been criticized as overly punitive and intensifying border militarization. With IIRAIRA, all aliens, regardless of legal status, were liable to removal and it expanded types of transgressions that could lead to removal.

Proponents of the IIRAIRA contend the law was necessary to end loopholes present beforehand in US immigration policy, which undermined the immigration system. A major motivator behind IIRAIRA was to deter further illegal immigration into the US, but the success in achieving this has been mixed, with both an increase in deportation since IIRAIRA was enacted in 1996, from around 50,000 to over 200,000 by the beginning of the 2000s, and also in illegal immigration since the enactment of IIRAIRA.

Before IIRAIRA, nonimmigrants who overstayed their visas or violated their conditions of admission were required to pay a fine, but were not restricted from later adjusting status to that of a lawful permanent resident. Since IIRAIRA, a non-immigrant who overstays their visa by one day or longer is ineligible to renew their visa. If they overstay their visa by a period between 180 and 365 days, they face a 3-year bar to reentry while an alien who overstays their visa beyond a year faces a 10-year bar.

== Public charge ==
IIRAIRA imposed new regulations concerning public charge determinations for aliens seeking admission. IIRAIRA requires that the individual(s) petitioning a family-sponsored immigrant must provide an affidavit of support. In the affidavit, the petitioner must "agree to provide support to maintain the sponsored alien at an annual income that is not less than 125 percent of the federal poverty guidelines" until the alien naturalizes as a U.S. citizen or the alien, the alien's parent, or the alien's spouse has worked for 40 qualifying quarters.

== Aggravated felonies ==
With IIRAIRA, the US Congress expanded the definition of the term aggravated felony. Aggravated felonies were first initiated with the Anti-Drug Abuse Act of 1988, and aggravated felonies consisted of murder, drug trafficking, and illicit firearm trafficking. The Anti-Drug Abuse Act of 1988 made any alien convicted of an aggravated felony at any time after their entry into the United States deportable. The Immigration Act of 1990, Immigration and Nationality Technical Corrections Act of 1994 and Anti-terrorism and Effective Death Penalty Act of 1996 increased the types of offenses considered aggravated felonies. In addition, with these laws, crimes with a penalty of 5 years or longer would be considered an aggravated felony.

After IIRAIRA, however, the penalty was changed so that any crime with a penalty of one year or longer would be considered an aggravated felony. Any alien who is convicted of an aggravated felony can face collateral immigration consequences: "aliens who have been convicted of an 'aggravated felony' are prohibited from receiving most forms of relief that would spare them from deportation, including asylum, and from being readmitted to the United States at any time in the future". There is a "presumption of deportability" for aliens convicted of aggravated felonies, in which aliens "convicted of an aggravated felony shall be conclusively presumed to be deportable from the United States".

Importantly, aggravated felony charges can be applied retroactively, so if a change in the law deems a new category of offense an aggravated felony, any alien previously convicted of that offense can then face removal.

Under IIRAIRA, any alien convicted of an aggravated felony is categorically barred from cancellation of removal and placed in a form of expedited removal proceedings (but these are distinct from expedited removal). Under IIRAIRA, expedited removal proceedings for aliens with aggravated felony charges are under the purview of the Attorney General who "shall provide for the initiation and, to the extent possible, the completion of removal proceedings, and any administrative appeals thereof, in the case of any alien convicted of an aggravated felony before the alien's release from incarceration for the underlying aggravated felony". Under these expedited removal proceedings, aliens do attend immigration court, and they are afforded the right to counsel (at no expense to the government) for their immigration court proceedings and judicial review of their determination of removal.

== Removal ==
IIRAIRA merged exclusion and deportation proceedings into removal proceedings. All aliens who are removable are subject to removal proceedings. Prior to IIRAIRA, aliens were subject to either deportation proceedings or exclusion proceedings. Deportation was reserved for aliens who "made an 'entry' into the U.S.", whereas exclusion proceedings were reserved for aliens who had not made entry into the United States. The consolidation of exclusion and deportation proceedings into removal proceedings was an attempt to streamline the process of deportation and exclusion. Under IIRAIRA, aliens "admitted to the United States, [aliens] applying for admission, and aliens present in the United States without being inspected and admitted" were all subject to removal proceedings. Removal proceedings are adjudicated by immigration judges, which fall under the purview of the Executive Office for Immigration Review, which is part of the Department of Justice.

Post-IIRAIRA removal proceedings are initiated with a notice to appear (NTA) that is sent to the alien. NTAs replaced Order to Show Cause and Notice of Time and Place documents. NTAs specify, among other things, "the nature of the proceedings against the alien", "the legal authority under which the proceedings are conducted", "the acts or conduct alleged to be in violation of the law" and "the charges against the alien and the statutory provisions alleged to have been violated". IIRAIRA established the authority of immigration judges in removal proceedings. Immigration judges "shall administer oaths, receive evidence, and interrogate, examine, and cross-examine the alien and any witnesses. The immigration judge may issue subpoenas for the attendance of witnesses and presentation of evidence".

Aliens have the right to a "reasonable opportunity to examine the evidence against the alien, to present evidence on the alien's own behalf, and to cross-examine witnesses presented by the Government" but not the right "to an application by the alien for discretionary relief under this Act". Further, under IIRAIRA, aliens "have the privilege of being represented, at no expense to the Government, by counsel of the alien's choosing". Therefore, aliens can have legal representation in immigration court, but they are not entitled to legal representation provided by the Government if they cannot afford an attorney.

IIRAIRA established a removal period of 90 days for aliens determined to be removable by an immigration judge. The removal period can begin when "the date the order of removal becomes administratively final", "the date of the court's final order" or if the date at which the alien is released from detention (only in cases of non-immigration related detention). Aliens can file one motion to reconsider the decision of an immigration judge, which must be filed within 30 days of the final order being issued. Aliens can also file 1 motion for reopening their case, which must be filed within 90 days of the final order of removal.

=== Cancellation of removal ===
IIRAIRA restricted aliens' access to cancellation of removal, which is a form of relief from deportation. Prior to IIRAIRA, aliens could receive cancellation of removal through discretionary relief from the Attorney General (this relief is carried out by immigration judges within Executive Office of Immigration Review.) In general, before IIRAIRA aliens could become eligible for cancellation of removal if they "established seven years continuous physical presence in the U.S., good moral character during that period, and that deportation would result in extreme hardship to the individual or to his or her spouse, parent, or child who was a U.S. citizen or lawful permanent resident". Cancellation of removal resulted in individuals becoming lawful permanent residents.

IIRAIRA restricted the requirements for individuals to become eligible for cancellation of removal and capped the number of cancellations available to 4,000 annually. With IIRAIRA, cancellation required continuous physical presence in the U.S. for 10 years prior to the initiation of removal proceedings, which is called the stop-time rule. In 1997, the Bureau of Immigration Appeals ruled that the stop-time rule can also be applied retroactively to individuals who began removal proceedings prior to IIRAIRA's implementation. An additional IIRAIRA mandated requirement for cancellation of removal is that aliens must demonstrate that removal would lead to "exceptional and extremely unusual hardship" to the individual's spouse, parent, or child who is a U.S. citizen or alien with legal permanent residence status. IIRAIRA eliminated the possibility of cancellation due to the hardship an individual themselves could face.

=== Expedited removal ===
IIRAIRA established expedited removal, in which immigration officials gained the authority to summarily remove certain aliens. This is different from the expedited removal proceedings for aliens convicted of aggravated felonies. Aliens subject to expedited removal include aliens "who are inadmissible because they lack valid entry documents or have sought admission through fraud (may also include aliens inadmissible on same grounds if they are present in the United States without being admitted or paroled and have been in the country less than two years)".

Expedited removals can be considered removals without hearings: these removals do not require judicial review by immigration judges within the Executive Office of Immigration Review unless the individual plans to apply for asylum or indicates fear of persecution. Therefore, aliens subject to expedited removal do not have the right to administrative review or the right to administrative appeal and judicial review. Because expedited removals do not require judicial or administrative review, aliens who are subject to expedited removals are not afforded the right to an attorney during their interviews with immigration officials.

=== Stipulated removal ===
IIRAIRA initiated stipulated removal, which is a type of plea agreement for aliens who are convicted of crimes in criminal court. Stipulated removal orders under IIRAIRA can be enacted for aliens facing felony and misdemeanor convictions that are considered aggravated felonies. Stipulated removal allocated to United States federal district court judges "jurisdiction to enter a judicial order of removal pursuant to the terms of such stipulation".

Orders of stipulated removal "constitute a conclusive determination of the alien's removability from the U.S." The plea agreements for stipulated removal orders make a "judicial order of removal from the United States […] a condition of the plea agreement" for the criminal conviction or a "condition of probation or supervised release, or both". With stipulated removal, aliens "waive the right to notice and hearing" for a determination of their removability.

IIRAIRA initiated exceptions for stipulated removal for individuals in "exceptional circumstances": serious illness of the alien or serious illness or death of the spouse, child, or parent of the alien, but not including less compelling circumstances) beyond the control of the alien.

=== Reinstatement of removal ===
IIRAIRA implemented a process called reinstatement of removal. Reinstatement of removal concerns the reentry of previously deported immigrants who previously left through voluntary departure or who were previously issued orders of removal who entered without lawful admission. With reinstatement of removal, "the prior order of removal is reinstated from its original date and is not subject to being reopened or reviewed" and the immigrant is ineligible for applying for or receiving any relief from removal. Reinstatement of removal allows for the individual to "be removed under the prior order at any time after the reentry".

== Bond and detention ==
IIRAIRA expanded the authority of the Attorney General to detain aliens who are facing removal. Under IIRAIRA, aliens "may be arrested and detained pending a decision on whether the alien is to be removed from the United States". IIRAIRA did not impose any limitations on the length of detention, but IIRAIRA did restrict these aliens' access to release from detention. Release could be granted with a "bond of at least $1,500" or on "conditional parole". aliens without legal permanent residence or prior work authorizations would be ineligible for receiving a work authorization during their release from detention.

IIRAIRA stipulated mandatory detention for aliens who furnished fraudulent documents or have convictions for aggravated felonies, including "crimes involving moral turpitude", as well as aliens found to have "membership in a terrorist organization". Demore v. Kim (2003) upheld the constitutionality of the mandatory detention of aliens with qualifying convictions.

The provisions of IIRAIRA concerning detention provide on their face as allowing for indefinite detention of aliens. This was upheld by the Supreme Court against constitutional challenge in Johnson v. Arteaga-Martinez (2022).

=== Administrative warrants ===
Codified in Section 1226(a) of Title 8 of the United States Code, Section 303 of the IIRAIRA broadly amended the use of non-judicial administrative warrants for immigration law enforcement, now commonly referred to as "ICE warrants" after the creation of U.S. Immigration and Customs Enforcement in 2003 as part of the Department of Homeland Security. While Section 1226 generally requires immigration officers to obtain administrative warrants before making immigration arrests, Section 1357(a) of Title 8 (which codifies Section 287 of the Immigration and Nationality Act of 1952) provides two exceptions that allow for warrantless arrests if an alien is suspected of having violated immigration law:

1. where "the alien…in the [immigration officer's] presence or view is entering or attempting to enter the United States [unlawfully]";
2. where "[the immigration officer] has reason to believe that the alien… is in the United States [unlawfully] and is likely to escape before a warrant can be obtained".

The U.S. Supreme Court upheld the constitutionality of Section 1226 in Demore v. Kim (2003), and lower federal courts have interpreted the "reason to believe" standard of Section 1357(a) to be functionally equivalent to the probable cause requirement of the Fourth Amendment. Such administrative warrants were originally authorized under Section 242 of the Immigration and Nationality Act of 1952, codified in Section 1252(a) of Title 8, and upheld by the Supreme Court in Abel v. United States (1960).

== Bars to re-entry ==
Various bars for reentry of aliens were established by IIRAIRA.

=== 3-year bar to entry ===
The 3-year bar to entry concerns aliens without lawful present status for more than 180 days but less than 365 days who returned to their home country voluntarily before the initiation of removal proceedings in immigration court. The 3-year bar begins on the date of the individual's departure or removal from the U.S.

=== 10-Year bar to entry ===
The 10-year bar to entry applies to any alien who was ordered removed in immigration court or to any alien who returned to their home country prior to the final adjudication of their removal proceedings in immigration court who were in the United States without lawful immigration status for one or more years. Individuals in either of these categories are summarily found ineligible for entry for 10 years. If an alien gains admission after the 10-year bar and is subsequently deported, IIRAIRA imposed a 20-year bar to entry.

=== Lifetime bar to Entry ===
Lifetime bars to reentry were established for any alien who was deported due to criminal convictions of aggravated felonies. These individuals face a lifetime bar to reentry.

== 287(g) program ==
IIRAIRA initiated the 287(g) program. The 287(g) program allows state and local law enforcement agencies to enter into agreements with Immigration and Naturalization Service (now Immigration and Customs Enforcement). These agreements allocate to certain agents the ability to "perform a function of an immigration officer in relation to the investigation, apprehension, or detention of aliens in the United States (including the transportation of such aliens across State lines to detention centers)". Under 287(g), law enforcement officers are deputized to gain immigration enforcement authority, such as investigating, apprehending, and detaining aliens whom the officer believes to be removable. When agencies enter into 287(g) agreements, the individuals deputized are under the direction of ICE, but they are not considered federal officials.

Local law enforcement is not allowed to enforce immigration law because that authority is vested in exclusively the federal government The 287(g) program has received pushback from some immigration scholars and immigrant advocacy groups, who expressed that the program increases racial profiling and undermines immigrants' rights. As of November 2021, there were 142 agencies with signed 287(g) agreements in the United States.

== Border enforcement provisions ==
Among other changes, IIRAIRA gave the United States Attorney General broad authority to construct barriers along the Mexico–United States border, and it authorized the construction of a secondary layer of border fencing to support the already-completed 14-mile primary fence. Construction of the secondary fence stalled because of environmental concerns raised by the California Coastal Commission. In April 2025, the Department of Homeland Security announced the waiver of environmental laws under the IIRAIRA authority to construct more physical barriers along the Mexico-U.S. border in Southern California.

IIRAIRA substantially increased funding directed toward the Mexico-United States Border. IIRAIRA appropriated $12 million of funding for multilayered fencing starting near San Diego, California and extending east for 14 miles. This funding was used to supplement existing fencing and add second and third layered fencing along that portion of the border.

In addition to the multilayered fencing near San Diego, California, IIRAIRA allocated additional technology and funding for the Border Patrol. Included in this allocation were "fixed wing aircraft, helicopters, four-wheel drive vehicles, sedans, night vision goggles, night vision scopes, and sensor units". (section 103). IIRAIRA required that the number of full-time, active-duty border patrol agents would increase by at least 1,000 "in each of the fiscal years 1997, 1998, 1999, 2000, and 2001". IIRAIRA also funded an increase of 300 supportive personnel in each of the fiscal years of 1997, 1998, 1999, 2000, and 2001. These new border patrol agents were to be stationed at areas with high proportions of illegal crossing, as measured within the previous year. Such areas were largely concentrated at the southern border (Mexico-United States Border).

IIRAIRA targeted funding for agents and technology to "areas of the border identified as areas of high illegal entry into the United States in order to provide a uniform and visible deterrent to illegal entry on a continuing basis". In doing so, IIRAIRA appropriated consistent funding that supported a border enforcement strategy known as "prevention through deterrence". Prevention through deterrence was first initiated in the early 1990s, and it aimed to reduce the number of migrants entering without authorization at high-traffic urban areas. According to reports by the Government Accountability Office, prevention through deterrence increased the number of migrants that died while crossing into the United States.

== Higher education restrictions ==
IIRAIRA expanded the restrictions on federally distributed post-secondary education funds that were initially enacted with the Personal Responsibility and Work Opportunity Reconciliation Act of 1996 (PRWORA). PRWORA denied federal funding for post-secondary education to most groups of aliens. IIRAIRA extended these restrictions, applying them to state-level funding decisions. Under IIRAIRA, a person who is not lawfully present in the United States shall not be eligible for State funding of post-secondary education benefits unless all citizens and nationals are also eligible, regardless of their state of residence. However, IIRAIRA does not define post secondary education benefits as tuition rates which are matriculation costs.

States have overcome these restrictions by basing eligibility on in-state tuition on factors besides residence, such as attendance at a high school in the state. Nevertheless, tuition rates which include student fees and matriculation costs are not defined as post-secondary education benefits. These provisions allow anyone, regardless of their immigration or citizenship status, to apply for in-state tuition if they meet the eligibility requirements. In doing so, the states have complied with the mandates established by IIRAIRA and PRWORA.

== Voting ==
IIRAIRA made it a criminal offense for an alien to vote in a federal election. This, however, does not apply to those who have resided in the United States as non-citizen U.S. nationals or permanent residents while they were under the age of 16 years, and both of their parents are U.S. citizens.

== See also ==
- Antiterrorism and Effective Death Penalty Act of 1996
- Immigration and Nationality Technical Corrections Act of 1994
- Immigration Act of 1990
- Anti-Drug Abuse Act of 1988
- Personal Responsibility and Work Opportunity Act
- Remain in Mexico
- Immigration and Nationality Act Section 287(g)
- Immigration detention in the United States
