= Executive Office for Immigration Review =

Office of the US Department of Justice

- Seal of the Executive Office for Immigration Review

Agency overview
- Formed: January 9, 1983
- Jurisdiction: Federal government of the United States
- Headquarters: Bailey's Crossroads, Virginia (Falls Church mailing address)
- Employees: 3,161 (2020)
- Annual budget: $734 million (FY 2021)
- Agency executives: Sirce Owen (acting), Director; Stephanie Gorman (acting), Deputy Director
- Parent agency: United States Department of Justice
- Child agencies: Office of the Chief Immigration Judge (Immigration Courts); Board of Immigration Appeals; Office of the Chief Administrative Hearing Officer
- Website: Official website

The Executive Office for Immigration Review (EOIR) is a sub-agency of the United States Department of Justice whose chief function is to conduct removal proceedings in immigration courts and adjudicate appeals arising from the proceedings. These administrative proceedings determine the removability and admissibility of individuals in the United States. As of 2026, there were approximately sixty-eight immigration courts and three adjudication centers throughout the United States.

== History and jurisdiction ==
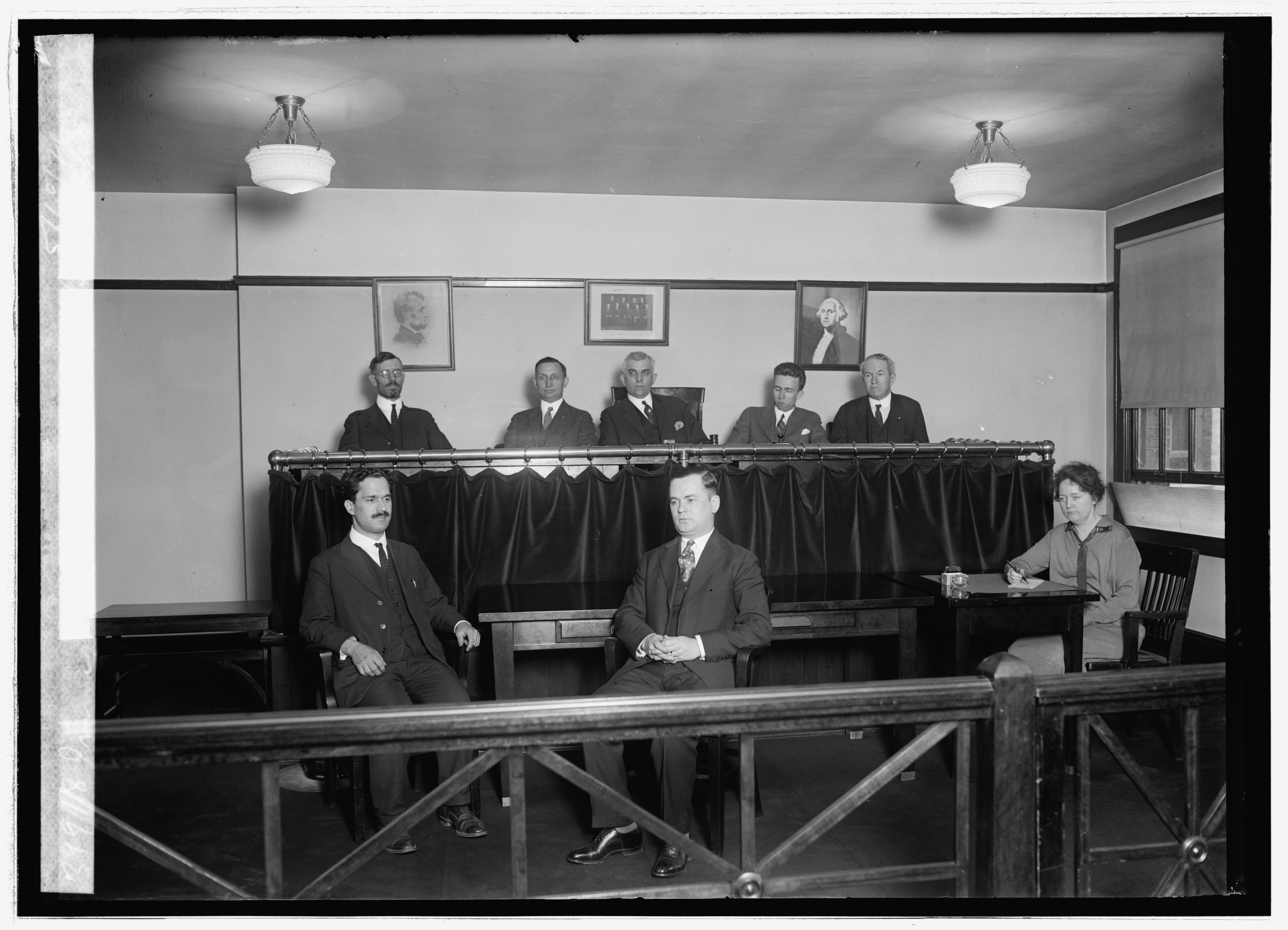
An immigration proceeding conducted in the Department of Labor, 1926.

EOIR was created in 1983 by the Department of Justice (DOJ) as part of an internal reorganization. Prior to 1983, the functions performed by EOIR were divided among different agencies. The earliest version of a specialized immigration service was the Immigration and Naturalization Service (INS), created in 1933, in the Department of Labor. Seven years later, in 1940, the INS moved from Labor to its present location in the Department of Justice. Twelve years after moving to DOJ, in 1952, the Immigration and Nationality Act organized all U.S. immigration laws into one statute, and designated "special inquiry officers," the predecessors of immigration judges, to decide questions of deportation.

EOIR adjudicates cases under a patchwork of immigration laws and regulations, including:

- Immigration and Nationality Act of 1952
- Immigration and Nationality Act of 1965
- Immigration Reform and Control Act of 1986
- United States Refugee Act of 1980
- Immigration Act of 1990
- Illegal Immigration Reform and Responsibility Act of 1996
- Real ID Act of 2005

In addition to these statutes, other federal statutes, agency regulations, and executive orders, federal courts also play an important role in immigration law. Because litigants have the right to appeal a decision to federal courts of appeal, different areas of the United States effectively have different immigration laws, notwithstanding Supreme Court review. In addition, federal statutes not facially related to immigration also may play a role in admissibility, including those related to public benefits.

== Structure ==
Within the Department of Justice, EOIR is one of a number of offices that answers directly to the Deputy Attorney General. EOIR itself has two members of its leadership team: a director, who is appointed by the Attorney General, and a deputy director who may exercise the full authority of the director. The current director is Sirce E. Owen, and the current deputy director is Stephanie Gorman.

=== Adjudicative components ===
==== Office of the Chief Immigration Judge ====
The Office of the Chief Immigration Judge (OCIJ) is the authority under which trial-level immigration judges are situated. Like the EOIR director and deputy director, the Chief Immigration Judge is appointed by the attorney general, though he or she is supervised directly by the director of EOIR. The Office of the Chief Immigration Judge oversees nearly 500 immigration judges, 60 immigration courts, and 30 assistant chief immigration judges (ACIJ) based in the various cities where U.S. immigration courts are located. Immigration judges adjudicate hearings under Section 240 of the INA.

Immigration judges, unlike Article III judges, do not have life tenure, and are not appointed by the President nor confirmed by the Senate as required by the Appointments Clause in Article II. Instead, they are civil servants appointed by the attorney general. The director of EOIR may also designate temporary immigration judges, who may serve for a period not longer than six months.

Immigration adjudication does not conform to the separation of functions as prescribed by the Administrative Procedure Act. Instead, the Department of Homeland Security initiates removal proceeding against a litigant; the immigration judge is employed by EOIR. In the removal proceeding, the U.S. Government is represented by an Assistant Chief Counsel, often referred to as a "DHS attorney" or "trial attorney." Unlike criminal adjudications in Article III courts, litigants in removal proceedings do not have a constitutional right to counsel, except in narrow circumstances.

==== Board of Immigration Appeals ====
The Board of Immigration Appeals (BIA) is the body to whom litigants may appeal their decisions from immigration judges. Composed of 15 permanent members appointed by the attorney general, BIA decisions are generally decided by either single members or panels of three of its members. Unlike courts of appeals in the state and federal systems, the BIA rarely holds oral arguments on appeals. Instead, the BIA conducts a "paper review" of the materials, before issuing a written decision. Though the BIA issues tens of thousands of decisions each year, it chooses a small number as "precedent decisions," which seek to provide guidance to immigration judges across the countries on the state of immigration law. After the BIA has decided a matter, it may choose to issue a final decision, remand to the immigration judge for further consideration, or refer the matter to the attorney general. The attorney general also may refer the case to him or herself and decide the case regardless of the decision of the BIA.

==== Office of the Chief Administrative Hearing Officer ====
The Office for the Chief Administrative Hearing Officer (OCAHO) oversees specialized immigration administrative law judges as provided for in the Immigration Reform and Control Act of 1986 and the Immigration Act of 1990. Unlike the immigration judges in the Office of the Chief Immigration Judge, who hear the merits of the immigration claims of litigants, the administrative law judges of the Chief Administrative Hearing Officer handle matters related to the employment of unauthorized workers in the United States; other unfair employment practices; and documentation fraud seeking immigration relief.

=== Non-adjudicative components ===
==== General Counsel ====
The Office of General Counsel (OGC) is the chief legal counsel of EOIR. The general counsel primarily provides legal guidance regarding precedential Board of Immigration Appeals and federal courts decisions and disseminates that information across EOIR. The Office of General Counsel also represents EOIR in federal court and responds to Freedom of Information Act requests directed at EOIR. The Office of General Counsel is also responsible for maintaining the standard for immigration attorneys nation-wide through its Attorney Discipline Program.

==== Office of Policy ====
EOIR's Office of Policy (OP), created in 2017, is responsible for communications, data collection, and regulatory review. Unlike the Office of general counsel, the Office of Policy does not represent EOIR in legal proceedings; it provides training and instructions to effectuate the policy of the director.

== Criticism and controversies ==
The Attorney General's use of precedent decisions has been subject to criticism. Some commentators have argued that the use of the power, instead of settling doctrine, has departed from agency procedures and practices, adjudicated issues not relevant to a particular case, and disrupted the development of circuit law by adopting the minority view.

EOIR has also been criticized for the significant backlog of immigration cases; as of December 2020, there are more than 1.2 million pending cases across the immigration courts. In 2018, the Department of Justice instituted case quotas for immigration judges, requiring each to complete 700 cases per year, a rate requiring each IJ to close more than two cases per day. The president of the National Association of Immigration Judges, stated that the policy was an "unprecedented act which compromises the integrity of the court."

A November 2019 report by the United States Department of Justice Office of the Inspector General found that "senior managers" involved in the hiring of Immigration Judges had used a system of "code words" to rate "the attractiveness" of female candidates. The report also found that this conduct "could give rise to claims of sexual harassment or claims of prohibited personnel practices."

In January 2021, the San Francisco Chronicle reported that the Executive Office for Immigration Review had failed to prevent or appropriately respond to multiple instances of sexual harassment by judges and supervisors. Tal Kopan, the reporter who broke the story, added later in an interview that more allegations not included in the story indicated that the problem was widespread and not an isolated occurrence.

In February 2024, Bloomberg Law News reported the Department of Justice paid 1.2 million dollars to resolve a lawsuit alleging sexual harassment by an Assistant Chief Immigration Judge. This follows findings by the United States Department of Justice Office of the Inspector General in March 2022, September 2023 and January 2024 of Immigration Judges who violated the Department's zero tolerance policy on sexual harassment and the ethical rules applicable to Immigration Judges United States Department of Justice Office of the Inspector General

== See also ==
- Title 8 of the Code of Federal Regulations
- U.S. Citizenship and Immigration Services (USCIS)
- U.S. Customs and Border Protection (CBP)
- U.S. Immigration and Customs Enforcement (ICE)
- Board of Immigration Appeals
- National Association of Immigration Judges
