= Cuban Adjustment Act =

1966 U.S. law to help Cuban immigrants become permanent residents

- Long title: An Act to adjust the status of Cuban immigrants to that of lawful permanent residents of the United States.
- Acronyms (colloquial): CAA
- Nicknames: Cuban Refugees Adjustment Status Act
- Enacted by: the 89th United States Congress
- Effective: November 2, 1966

Citations
- Public law: 89-732
- Statutes at Large: 80 Stat. 1161

Codification
- Titles amended: 8 U.S.C.: Aliens and Nationality
- U.S.C. sections amended: 8 U.S.C. ch. 12, subch. II § 1255

Legislative history
- Introduced in the House as H.R. 15183 by Jacob H. Gilbert (D–NY) on September 1, 1966; Committee consideration by House Judiciary; Passed the House on September 19, 1966 (300-25); Passed the Senate on October 6, 1966 (passed voice vote, in lieu of S. 3712); Reported by the joint conference committee on October 13, 1966; agreed to by the Senate on October 20, 1966 (agreed voice vote) and by the House on October 21, 1966 (agreed voice vote); Signed into law by President Lyndon B. Johnson on November 2, 1966

The Cuban Adjustment Act (CAA) (Spanish: Ley de Ajuste Cubano), Public Law 89-732, is a United States federal law enacted on November 2, 1966. Passed by the 89th United States Congress and signed by President Lyndon Johnson, the legislation applies to citizens of Cuba admitted into the U.S. after January 1, 1959—the date of the Cuban Communist Revolution—and who have been present in the U.S. for at least two years (later amended to one year). Those persons, and their spouses and children, can be granted lawful permanent resident status on an expedited basis.

Since its enactment, the CAA has been a target of criticism and undergone minor modifications. During the "thaw" in Cuba-United States relations in the Obama administration, many thought the CAA would be repealed as an obsolete relic of the Cold War. However, the law has remained intact.

== Original legislation ==
In the 1960s, tens of thousands of Cubans were fleeing the revolution and coming to the U.S. by varied means, some even by makeshift rafts. To obtain lawful permanent residency (often called a "green card") in the U.S., they would have been required, under the provisions of the 1952 Immigration and Nationality Act, to travel back to their home country to request a formal entry visa. Since that was not politically feasible, the Cuban Adjustment Act (CAA) devised a process by which these immigrants could regularize, i.e., "adjust" in legal terminology, their U.S. resident status without needing to return to Cuba.

On September 19, 1966, members of the 89th U.S. House of Representatives approved, by a 300–25 vote, H.R. 15183: "An Act to adjust the status of Cuban refugees to that of lawful permanent residents of the United States". The CAA's legislative journey culminated in its enactment on November 2, 1966.

At the heart of the CAA is a special set of rules for Cuban immigrants who can be fast-tracked to permanent residency with the approval of the U.S. Attorney General (and five years after obtaining a green card, they can become U.S. citizens). In addition to enjoying reduced wait times and a waiver on most documentation requirements, Cubans are exempt from immigration quotas, and are exempt from the following mandates imposed on other immigrants:

- Must enter the U.S. at a legal port of entry.
- Must show a family-based or employment-based reason for residency.
- Must not be a public charge.

== Other legal modes of migration ==
Without the CAA, Cubans can legally migrate to the U.S. through an assortment of programs that include immigrant visa issuance, resettlement for asylum seekers, and lotteries.

Immigrant visas are issued to the parents, spouses, and unmarried children of U.S. citizens as soon as the immigrant visa petition is approved by the U.S. Citizenship and Immigration Services. Immigrant visas are also available to persons who qualify for family or employment-based visas under the preference system that controls numerically limited immigration to the U.S. The preference system allows lawful permanent residents of the U.S. to bring their spouses, minor children, and unmarried adult children into the country. The waiting period for preference visas varies by category.

Under the U.S.-Cuba Migration Accords, the U.S. issues some 20,000 travel documents annually to Cubans for permanent resettlement in the U.S. Those who have been persecuted in Cuba, or fear persecution due to their religious or political beliefs, may apply at the U.S. Embassy in Havana for asylum via the in-country refugee program.

The Special Cuban Migration Program (SCMP), or "Cuban lottery", was open to all adult Cubans between the ages of 18 and 55 years of age who resided in Cuba regardless of whether they qualified for U.S. immigrant visa or refugee programs. The lottery provided an additional avenue of legal migration to a diverse group of Cubans, including those who might not have close relatives in the U.S. The last registration period was held from June 15 to July 15, 1998. The SCMP was superseded in 2007 by the Cuban Family Reunification Parole Program (CFRP).

Cubans can also participate in the Diversity Immigrant Visa (DIV) program, sometimes known as the "green card lottery". Under its provisions, 55,000 visas are made available annually to eligible applicants from around the world. Cubans have consistently been among the biggest winners of the lottery.

== Modifications to the CAA ==
The original CAA permitted Cubans to obtain green cards if they were present in the U.S. for at least two years. In legislation passed in October 1976, the residency duration was reduced to one year.

Shortly after the Refugee Act of 1980 (Pub. L. 96-212) was passed, over 100,000 Cubans fled to the U.S. The Carter administration, fearing the Refugee Act had contributed to this spike in asylum seekers, temporarily paused the Refugee Act's enforcement. Once the influx of Cubans subsided, the legislation was resumed.

The CAA initially allowed Cubans who traveled as far as U.S. territorial waters to continue on with their journey and settle in the U.S. In May 1995, the Clinton administration announced an agreement with the Cuban government to implement a so-called "wet foot, dry foot policy". It limited CAA's scope to only those Cubans who successfully reached "dry land"; all others who were interdicted at sea would be returned to the island.

In the waning months of Obama's presidency, Cuban migration to the U.S. surged because many feared the CAA would be eliminated as part of the President's efforts to normalize diplomatic relations with Cuba. However, no such drastic change occurred. In late 2015, Representative Paul Gosar (R-AZ) introduced legislation to repeal the CAA, but his bill gained little support from Cuban-Americans and never came up for a House vote.

The only CAA modification implemented by Obama took place in January 2017 when he abolished the "wet foot, dry foot policy". This meant that all unauthorized Cuban migrants would be repatriated to Cuba, even those who managed to arrive at the U.S. shore. The goal was to discourage Cubans from attempting the perilous voyage at sea since there was no promise of reward at the end. The CAA still remained in effect, but one of its core components had been eliminated.

== Criticisms ==
Since its enactment, the Cuban Adjustment Act has been a target of criticism for a variety of reasons:

1. It unfairly grants Cubans preferential treatment: The CAA has stirred resentment as to why Cubans enjoy "broader protections than any other immigrants arriving in the United States". El Salvador Foreign Minister Hugo Martínez said, "We see it as a double standard. It's a policy that allows one set of migrants to be treated in a privileged manner and another set of migrants in a discriminatory fashion."
2. It once served a purpose, but is now obsolete: Some critics claim that "repeal of this Cold War relic of immigration policy is long overdue." It was intended for political asylum seekers, but "the law is being abused by recent waves of Cuban arrivals who regularly travel back and forth between Cuba and the United States as economic, not political, refugees."
3. It has become a legal loophole exploited by unscrupulous persons: An investigation by South Florida's Sun Sentinel newspaper alleged that the CAA had enabled a veritable crime syndicate: "[A] small cadre of Cubans specializing in Medicare and insurance fraud have bilked American taxpayers and businesses out of more than $2 billion since 1994. Even when caught and prosecuted (many, if not most, flee back to Cuba before capture), they cannot be deported, because Cuba refuses to accept them."

In addition, the law has been harshly criticized by the Cuban government for "encouraging illegal emigration from the island". In his autobiography, Fidel Castro said:

The people who leave here illegally are the only citizens in the world who, if they violate the laws of the United States and enter that country by any means, even if they land with false documents, a false passport, when they arrive at the airport, they say, "I'm so-and-so, a Cuban citizen, and I claim refugee status under the Cuban Adjustment Act," and that's all they have to do – the next day they have the right to live and work there. Before, they had to wait a year, but no more. Objective? To destabilize.

Still, the CAA has its staunch defenders, and it has been difficult to find sufficient consensus in the U.S. to repeal it.

== See also ==
- Cuba–United States relations
- Immigration and Nationality Act of 1952
- Mariel boatlift
- Wet foot, dry foot policy
