= Johnson v. Arteaga-Martinez =

- Supreme Court of the United States

Argued January 11, 2022 Decided June 13, 2022
- Full case name: Tae D. Johnson, Acting Director of U.S. Immigration and Customs Enforcement, et al. v. Antonio Arteaga-Martinez
- Docket no.: 19-896
- Citations: 596 U.S. 573 (more)
- Argument: Oral argument

Holding
- Illegal Immigration Reform and Immigrant Responsibility Act of 1996 does not require the government to provide noncitizens detained for six months with bond hearings in which the Government bears the burden of proving, by clear and convincing evidence, that a noncitizen poses a flight risk or a danger to the community.

Court membership
- Chief Justice John Roberts Associate Justices Clarence Thomas · Stephen Breyer; Samuel Alito · Sonia Sotomayor; Elena Kagan · Neil Gorsuch; Brett Kavanaugh · Amy Coney Barrett

Case opinions
- Majority: Sotomayor, joined by Roberts, Thomas, Alito, Kagan, Gorsuch, Kavanaugh, Barrett
- Concurrence: Thomas, joined by Gorsuch (Part I)
- Concur/dissent: Breyer

Laws applied
- Illegal Immigration Reform and Immigrant Responsibility Act of 1996

Johnson v. Arteaga-Martinez, 596 U.S. 573 (2022), was a United States Supreme Court case in which the court held that Section 1231(a)(6) of the Illegal Immigration Reform and Immigrant Responsibility Act of 1996 does not require the government to provide noncitizens detained for six months with bond hearings in which the Government bears the burden of proving, by clear and convincing evidence, that a noncitizen poses a flight risk or a danger to the community.

== Background ==
Aliens who have been ordered to be deported by immigration courts can be detained by the federal government, pending their removal from the country. The statute that authorizes such detention does not contain a set time limit for the detention, but in Zadvydas v. Davis (2001), the Supreme Court read in a six-month limitation to avoid what it perceived were constitutional issues. Antonio Arteaga-Martinez filed a petition for a writ of habeas corpus in the United States District Court for the Middle District of Pennsylvania, arguing he was detained unlawfully due to the absence of a bond hearing. The district court granted his petition and ordered him released from detention, and after the federal government appealed, the United States Court of Appeals for the Third Circuit summarily affirmed, citing to its previous opinion in Guerrero-Sanchez v. Warden. The government subsequently filed a petition for a writ of certiorari.

== Supreme Court ==
Certiorari was granted in the case and the companion case Garland v. Gonzalez on August 23, 2021. Oral arguments were held on January 11, 2022. On June 13, 2022, the Supreme Court reversed the Third Circuit in a 8–1 vote, with Justice Sonia Sotomayor writing the majority opinion, Justice Clarence Thomas concurring, and Justice Stephen Breyer concurring in part and dissenting in part.
