= Clark v. Martinez =

- Supreme Court of the United States

Argued October 13, 2004 Decided January 12, 2005
- Full case name: Clark, Field Office Director, Seattle, Immigration and Customs Enforcement, et al. v. Martinez
- Docket no.: 03-878
- Citations: 543 U.S. 371 (more) 125 S. Ct. 716; 160 L. Ed. 2d 734; 2005 U.S. LEXIS 627
- Argument: Oral argument
- Opinion announcement: Opinion announcement

Holding
- Under §1231(a)(6), the Secretary may detain inadmissible aliens beyond the 90-day removal period, but only for so long as is reasonably necessary to achieve removal; a six-month presumptive detention period applies to inadmissible aliens.

Court membership
- Chief Justice William Rehnquist Associate Justices John P. Stevens · Sandra Day O'Connor; Antonin Scalia · Anthony Kennedy; David Souter · Clarence Thomas; Ruth Bader Ginsburg · Stephen Breyer

Case opinions
- Majority: Scalia, joined by Stevens, O'Connor, Kennedy, Souter, Ginsburg, Breyer
- Concurrence: O'Connor
- Dissent: Thomas, joined by Rehnquist

Laws applied
- 8 U.S.C. § 1231(a)(6)

Clark v. Martinez, 543 U.S. 371 (2005), was a United States Supreme Court case ending the detention of people who had been denied refugee status. They were kept in prison awaiting deportation even though they could not in fact be deported due to a political stalemate with Cuba. An alien can be found inadmissible on the grounds of poor health, criminal history, substance trafficking, prostitution/human trafficking, money laundering, terrorist activity, etc. The deportation process requires a ruling from an immigration judge for violating immigration laws. The case resolved conflicting rulings made by the 9th and 11th circuits on whether Zadvydas v. Davis (2001) was applicable to inadmissible immigrants, Sergio Martinez and Daniel Benitez. The cases of Martinez and Benitez were later consolidated by the Supreme Court.

Zadvydas v. Davis stated that the government can detain admissible and admitted aliens only long enough beyond the 90-day removal period if necessary for deportation. If deportation is unforeseeable then the immigrant must be released. Zadvydas v. Davis did not decide if immigrants inadmissible to the U.S. have the same protections.

The Supreme Court decision (7-2) found that Zadvydas v. Davis was applicable to inadmissible immigrants. In the case of Martinez and Benitez where deportation to Cuba was implausible, further detention was deemed unnecessary. The case was decided on statutory grounds.

== History ==
Sergio Suarez Martinez and Daniel Benitez arrived to the US from Cuba in June 1980 via the Mariel Boatlift. They were released into the country pursuant to the Attorney General's discretionary power under 8 U.S.C. § 1182. By the time they had applied for legal permanent residence through the Cuban Refugee Adjustment Act, which allowed Cubans paroled into the United States to gain lawful resident status after living in the US for one year, both men had racked up significant criminal charges. They were found to be inadmissible as a consequence of those convictions, and could not qualify for the adjustment from refugee to legal permanent resident.

When Martinez sought adjustment in 1991, he had already been convicted of assault with a deadly weapon in Rhode Island and burglary in California, while Benitez, who sought adjustment in 1985, had been convicted of grand theft in Florida. Both men were convicted of additional felonies after their adjustment applications were denied.

Both Martinez and Benitez had their parole revoked and faced deportation by Immigration and Naturalization Services (INS). Both remained in immigration detention after the 90-day period. While being detained by INS, Martinez and Benitez each filed a petition for a writ of habeas corpus under 28 U.S.C. § 2241 to challenge their indefinite detention.

On October 30, 2002, Martinez was granted petition by the United States District Court for the District of Oregon under Martinez v. Smith and was to be released at the digression of INS. Benitez, meanwhile, was denied petition by the United States District Court for the Northern District of Florida under Benitez v. Wallis on July 11, 2002. These contradicting interpretations of Zadvydas v. Davis led to the cases being consolidated by the United States Supreme Court.

=== Mariel Boatlift 1980 ===
The Mariel Boatlift, was a series of boatlifts that took place from April 15 to October 31, 1980. The boatlift was responsible for the transport of 125,000 Cubans from the port of Mariel to southern Florida. Within this time frame Fidel Castro allowed any Cuban who wanted to leave and had a permit to do so through the Port of Mariel. The United States Coast Guard began to see numerous personal vessels flood out of Key West and Miami, Florida. The first flood out of the U.S. were 20–40 ft pleasure boats belonging to Cuban American's who had relatives in Cuba. By the 21st, a second flood of Cuban Americans attempting to rent or buy boats came. Not long after their departure for Mariel the Coast Guard began to receive distress calls and several search and rescue mission were required.

Of the 125,000 refugees 2,300 had previous criminal charges in Cuba, under U.S. law 2,746 were considered criminals. Many of the 2,746 criminals that applied for US residency under the 1984 Cuban Refugee Adjustment Act were declared unfit due to the alien's disciplinary record and criminal record.

== Statute ==
Title 8 USC §1231(a)(6) says the following: 8 U.S.C. § 1231

An alien ordered removed who is inadmissible under section 1182 of this title, removable under section 1227(a)(1)(C), 1227(a)(2), or 1227(a)(4) of this title or who has been determined by the Attorney General to be a risk to the community or unlikely to comply with the order of removal, may be detained beyond the removal period and, if released, shall be subject to the terms of supervision in paragraph (3).

== Decision ==
The court's decision was delivered by Justice Antonin Scalia. Much of the controversy came from the ambiguous wording of the Zadvydas v. Davis decision. Zadvydas v. Davis ruled that admissible aliens facing deportation who had already been granted US residency may not be detained longer than the 90-day removal period.

Justice Anthony Kennedy in dissent in Zadvydas had objected:

Accepting the majority's interpretation, then, there are two possibilities, neither of which is sustainable. On the one hand, it may be that the majority's rule applies to both categories of aliens, in which case we are asked to assume that Congress intended to restrict the discretion it could confer upon the Attorney General so that all inadmissible aliens must be allowed into our community within six months. On the other hand, the majority's logic might be that inadmissible and removable aliens can be treated differently. Yet it is not a plausible construction of § 1231(a)(6) to imply a time limit as to one class but not to another. The text does not admit of this possibility. As a result, it is difficult to see why "[a]liens who have not yet gained initial admission to this country would present a very different question.

This led to confusion in the lower courts. Scalia's response to the dissent follows:

Despite the dissent's repeated claims that §1231(a)(6) could not be given a different reading for inadmissible aliens, see Zadvydas, supra, at 710, 716-717 (opinion of Kennedy, J.), the Court refused to decide that question—the question we answer today. It is indeed different from the question decided in Zadvydas, but because the statutory text provides for no distinctions between admitted and nonadmitted aliens, we find that it results in the same answer.

Kennedy's objection—that Zadvydas might be read to overturn prior cases and Constitutionally forbid the indefinite detention of aliens seeking "initial admission to this country"—was the question presented in Clark v. Martinez:

For this Court to sanction indefinite detention in the face of Zadvydas would establish within our jurisprudence, beyond the power of Congress to remedy, the dangerous principle that judges can give the same statutory text different meanings in different cases.

Clark v. Martinez also poses the controversial question of where aliens physically are while their status is being determined.

One of the government's tactics has been to deny release to people who are "paroled" into the United States, meaning that they are physically allowed into the country while their status is being determined. Technically, they are not considered to be "in" the country.

== Aftermath ==
Martinez was held by INS until after the decision in 2005. Benitez was paroled and released to family sponsors, two days after his case was heard by the Supreme Court, October 15, 2004.

Daniel Benitez died March 29, 2005, just months after his case was decided in January, 2005. Sergio Suarez Martinez can be found as a registered sex offender, otherwise his whereabouts are unknown.

== Implementation ==
With the decision of Clark v. Martinez, Mariel Cubans who have been under long term detention are to be released from custody.
