= Bureau of Population, Refugees, and Migration =

U.S. State Department division

- Seal of the United States Department of State

Bureau overview
- Formed: 1993; 33 years ago
- Preceding bureau: Bureau of Refugee Programs
- Jurisdiction: Executive branch of the United States
- Employees: 225 (FY 2016)
- Annual budget: $3.1 billion (FY 2015)
- Bureau executive: Andrew Veprek, Assistant Secretary of State for Population, Refugees, and Migration
- Parent department: U.S. Department of State
- Website: Official website

The Bureau of Population, Refugees, and Migration (PRM) is a bureau within the United States Department of State.

It has primary responsibility for formulating policies on population, refugees, and migration, and for administering U.S. refugee assistance and admissions programs. The bureau is headed by the assistant secretary of state for population, refugees, and migration and the official currently acting in this capacity is PRM Acting Assistant Secretary Marta C. Youth. Youth has headed PRM since former assistant secretary Julieta Valls Noyes retired from the Foreign Service on October 4, 2024.

PRM provides aid for and seeks to enhance the protection of refugees, victims of conflict and stateless people around the world, and manages the US Refugee Admissions Program to resettle refugees in the United States. PRM is a major funder of the UN Refugee Agency (UNHCR), the International Committee of the Red Cross (ICRC), the International Organization for Migration (IOM) and other aid groups. PRM also promotes the United States' population and migration policies in international fora and with other governments.

PRM's principal authorities derive from a pair of statutes, the Migration and Refugee Assistance Act of 1962 and the Refugee Act of 1980.

== History ==
The bureau's predecessor, the Bureau of Refugee Programs, began in late-1979. In 1993, the bureau added population issues to its portfolio, and the bureau was changed into its current form, the Bureau of Population, Refugees, and Migration.

On July 11, 2025, Secretary of State Marco Rubio began shutting down the bureau.

== Organization ==
The Bureau of Population, Refugees, and Migration is divided into unique offices.

- Front Office
- Office of the Comptroller
- Office of the Executive Director
- Office of Policy and Resource Planning
- Office of Public and Congressional Affairs
- Office of Multilateral Coordination and External Relations
  - Communicates U.S. policy in multilateral organizations, including UNHCR, the International Committee of the Red Cross, and the International Organization for Migration
- Office of Refugee Processing
  - Refugee Processing Center
- Office of Population and International Migration
  - Represents the United States in the United Nations Population Fund and the UN Commission on Population and Development
- Office of Assistance for Africa
- Office of Assistance for Europe, Central Asia, and the Americas
- Office of Assistance for Asia and the Near East
