= Johnson v. Guzman Chavez =

- Supreme Court of the United States

Argued January 11, 2021 Decided June 29, 2021
- Full case name: Tae D. Johnson, Acting Director of U.S. Immigration and Customs Enforcement, et al. v. Maria Angelica Guzman Chavez, et al.
- Docket no.: 19-897
- Citations: 594 U.S. ___ (more) 141 S. Ct. 2271
- Argument: Oral argument

Holding
- Non-citizens subject to reinstated deportation orders are not entitled to bond hearings while seeking to prevent the deportation; their removal orders are "administratively final."

Court membership
- Chief Justice John Roberts Associate Justices Clarence Thomas · Stephen Breyer; Samuel Alito · Sonia Sotomayor; Elena Kagan · Neil Gorsuch; Brett Kavanaugh · Amy Coney Barrett

Case opinions
- Majority: Alito (except as to footnote 4), joined by Roberts, Thomas, Gorsuch, Kavanaugh, Barrett
- Plurality: Alito (footnote 4), joined by Roberts, Kavanaugh, Barrett
- Concurrence: Thomas (except for footnote 4 and in the judgment), joined by Gorsuch
- Dissent: Breyer, joined by Sotomayor, Kagan

Johnson v. Guzman Chavez, 594 U.S. ___ (2021), was a United States Supreme Court case in which the court held that non-citizens subject to reinstated deportation orders are not entitled to bond hearings while seeking to prevent the deportation; their removal orders are "administratively final."

== Background ==
Maria Angelica Guzman Chavez and others were deported by the federal government and later reentered the country, and were detained under 8 U.S.C. § 1231 pending the outcome of their withholding of removal claims. Because they claimed a fear of persecution in the country of removal, they could not be removed from the country until the claims were resolved, which could take months, or even years. The detained non-citizens sought to be released while these claims were pending, via bond hearings under 8 U.S.C. § 1226. The district court sided with their claims, and the United States Court of Appeals for the Fourth Circuit affirmed. The federal government filed a petition for a writ of certiorari.

== Supreme Court ==
Certiorari was granted on June 15, 2020 to decide which statute applies to noncitizens with reinstated removal orders. The Supreme Court held oral arguments on January 11, 2021. On June 29, 2021, the Supreme Court reversed the Fourth Circuit, holding that the respondents were not entitled to bond hearings for release while their other claims were pending. Justice Stephen Breyer wrote a dissent joined by liberal justices Sonia Sotomayor and Elena Kagan.

=== Oral argument ===
During oral argument the justices asked about how withholding relief works in practice. They wanted to know how often noncitizens who are granted withholding relief are released into the United States (because no third country is willing to accept them), and what percentage of withholding applicants are granted relief. Six justices asked how a removal order could be "final" per §1231 if the granting of withholding relief would, in most cases, mean the noncitizen could not be removed from the United States.

=== Decision ===
The court said the removal orders were final removal orders under §1231, even with pending claims. In most cases a noncitizen must be removed within a 90-day window. However, in some cases removal may take a long time, and language in §1231 allow detention beyond 90 days in some situations. Zadvydas v. Davis said that, after six months of detention, an alien is entitled to a hearing, and if they are not going to be removed "in the reasonably foreseeable future", they must be released.

Aliens are detained under §1226 before they are ordered remove. They are detained under §1231 after they have been ordered removed, as in the present case where they re-entered the country illegally after deportation. Congress has legitimate reasons to create these classifications: There is less of a flight risk in §1226 proceedings because there is a possibility of being admitted to the country.

=== Breyer's dissent ===
Justice Breyer noted that it can often take over a year to decide withholding claims: "I can find no good reason why Congress would have wanted categorically to deny bond hearings to those who, like respondents, seek to have removal withheld or deferred due to a reasonable fear of persecution or torture. And I do not agree with the majority's reading of the statute's language as denying them that opportunity."
