= Garland v. Aleman Gonzalez =

- Supreme Court of the United States

Argued January 11, 2022 Decided June 13, 2022
- Full case name: Merrick B. Garland, Attorney General, et al. v. Esteban Aleman Gonzalez, et al.
- Docket no.: 20-322
- Citations: 596 U.S. 543 (more)
- Argument: Oral argument

Holding
- Section 1252(f)(1) of the Immigration and Nationality Act deprived the district courts of jurisdiction to issue the class-wide injunction.

Court membership
- Chief Justice John Roberts Associate Justices Clarence Thomas · Stephen Breyer; Samuel Alito · Sonia Sotomayor; Elena Kagan · Neil Gorsuch; Brett Kavanaugh · Amy Coney Barrett

Case opinions
- Majority: Alito, joined by Roberts, Thomas, Gorsuch, Kavanaugh, Barrett
- Concur/dissent: Sotomayor, joined by Kagan; Breyer (Parts II–A–2, II–B–2, and III)

Laws applied
- Illegal Immigration Reform and Immigrant Responsibility Act of 1996

Garland v. Aleman Gonzalez, 596 U.S. 543 (2022), was a United States Supreme Court case related to immigration detention.

Esteban Aleman Gonzales and Jose Eduardo Gutierrez Sanchez are native citizens of Mexico who were detained under the Immigration and Nationality Act after an illegal re-entry to the United States. They filed a class action claiming they were, after a six month detention period, entitled to a bond hearing where the government has to justify extending the detention period by proving they are dangerous or non-compliant.

The District Court certified a class and granted injunctive relief. The Ninth Circuit affirmed. The Supreme Court granted certiorari for the threshold question of whether the District Court had jurisdiction to grant class-wide injunctive relief under the INA. The case consolidated two class actions.

== Statutory text ==
8 USC §1252(f)(1) states:

Regardless of the nature of the action or claim or of the identity of the party or parties bringing the action, no court (other than the Supreme Court) shall have jurisdiction or authority to enjoin or restrain the operation of the provisions of part IV of this subchapter, as amended by the Illegal Immigration Reform and Immigrant Responsibility Act of 1996, other than with respect to the application of such provisions to an individual alien against whom proceedings under such part have been initiated.

== Supreme Court ==
Certiorari was granted in the case and the companion case Johnson v. Arteaga-Martinez on August 23, 2021. Oral arguments were held on January 11, 2022. On June 13, 2022, the Supreme Court reversed the Ninth Circuit in a 6–3 vote, with Justice Samuel Alito writing the majority opinion, and Justice Sonia Sotomayor concurring in the judgment in part and dissenting in part.

=== Opinion of the Court ===
The court's majority opinion authored by Justice Alito concluded that section 1252(f)(1) of the INA deprived the district courts of jurisdiction to issue the class-wide injunction.

The Court analyzed the statutory language and concluded that "§1252(f)(1) generally prohibits lower courts from entering injunctions that order federal officials to take or to refrain from taking actions to enforce, implement, or otherwise carry out the specified statutory provisions." The Court rejected an argument that §1252(f)(1) only bars "class-wide injunctions that prohibit the Government from doing what the statute allows or commands" because the "most natural interpretation of the term 'operation'" is not limited by lawfulness: "If cars, trucks, railroads, water utilities, drainage ditches, auto dealerships, and many other things can be unlawfully or improperly operated, it is not apparent why the same can not be said of a statute".

Furthermore, the court argued, if respondents' interpretation were to be adopted, 1252(f)(1) would cover only constitutional claims with almost no exception:

"But it would be most unusual for Congress to disfavor constitutional claims in this way. Cf. Webster v. Doe, 486 U. S. 592, 603 (1988) (requiring "clear" indication of congressional intent to "preclude judicial review of constitutional claims"). And if Congress had wanted to target just constitutional claims, it could have surely made the point more directly."

In addition the court emphasized the singular-person character of the language - "an individual alien", and cited dictum from a previous case which said the provision "prohibits federal courts from granting classwide injunctive relief".

=== Sotomayor's Opinion ===
Justice Sotomayor wrote an opinion concurring in judgement in part "because the government prevails on the merits", while dissenting on the jurisdiction issue. Justice Kagan joined fully, and Justice Breyer partially. Justice Sotomayor described the court as "elevate[ing] piecemeal dictionary definitions and policy concerns over plain meaning and context". She then turned to context for illuminating the primary clause, arguing that the statute's regular use of "implementation" in place of the court's "operation", and its use of "enjoin" in a more narrow sense in other provisions, suggests an interpretation that doesn't strip the lower courts of their injunctive power in cases like these. Along with this, the dissent disregarded the courts list of improper "operation[s]", reasoning that "Unlike all of those examples, a statute is the law. Officials may implement a statute unlawfully, but a statute does not operate in conflict with itself."

In response to the court's emphasis on the word "individual", the dissent cited Califano v. Goldfarb as a case that held the mere use of "individual" not to preclude classwide relief.
