= Refugee Act of 1980 =

Law governing refugee entrance to the US

Refugee Act
- Other short titles: Refugee Act of 1980
- Long title: An Act to amend the Immigration and Nationality Act to revise the procedures for the admission of refugees, to amend the Migration and Refugee Assistance Act of 1962 to establish a more uniform basis for the provision of assistance to refugees, and for other purposes.
- Nicknames: Refugee Act of 1979
- Enacted by: the 96th United States Congress
- Effective: March 17, 1980

Citations
- Public law: 96-212
- Statutes at Large: 94 Stat. 102

Codification
- Acts amended: Immigration and Nationality Act of 1952; Migration and Refugee Assistance Act
- Titles amended: 8 U.S.C.: Aliens and Nationality
- U.S.C. sections amended: 8 U.S.C. ch. 12, subch. I § 1101 et seq.; 8 U.S.C. ch. 12, subch. II §§ 1157-1159; 8 U.S.C. ch. 12, subch. IV § 1521 et seq.

Legislative history
- Introduced in the Senate as S. 643 by Ted Kennedy (D–MA) on March 13, 1979; Committee consideration by Senate Judiciary, House Judiciary; Passed the Senate on September 6, 1979 (85-0); Passed the House on December 20, 1979 (328-47, in lieu of H.R. 2816); Reported by the joint conference committee on February 22, 1980; agreed to by the Senate on February 26, 1980 (agreed) and by the House on March 4, 1980 (211-195); Signed into law by President Jimmy Carter on March 17, 1980

The United States Refugee Act of 1980 (Public Law 96-212) is an amendment to the earlier Immigration and Nationality Act of 1965 and the Migration and Refugee Assistance Act of 1962, and was created to provide a permanent and systematic procedure for the admission to the United States of refugees of special humanitarian concern to the U.S., and to provide comprehensive and uniform provisions for the effective resettlement and absorption of those refugees who are admitted. The act was passed by Congress on March 4, 1980, was signed by President Jimmy Carter on March 17, 1980, and became effective on April 1, 1980. This was the first comprehensive amendment of U.S. general immigration laws designed to face up to the realities of modern refugee situations by stating a clear-cut national policy and providing a flexible mechanism to meet the rapidly shifting developments of today's world policy. The main objectives of the act were to create a new, American definition of refugee based on the one created at the 1951 UN Convention and 1967 Protocol on the Status of Refugees; raise the limitation from 17,400 to 50,000 refugees admitted each fiscal year; provide emergency procedures for when that number exceeds 50,000; require annual consultation between Congress and the President on refugee admissions; and establish the Office of U.S. Coordinator for Refugee Affairs and the Office of Refugee Resettlement. Most importantly, it established explicit procedures on how to deal with refugees in the U.S. by creating a uniform and effective resettlement and absorption policy.

== Purpose ==
The Act recognizes that it has been the historic policy of the United States to respond to the urgent needs of persons subject to persecution in their homelands and to provide assistance, asylum, and resettlement opportunities to admitted refugees. The goal of the Refugee Act was to create a uniform procedure with which to provide these opportunities to refugees.

== Policy specifications ==
The Act amended the Immigration and Nationality Act of 1965 by defining a refugee as any person who is outside his or her country of residence or nationality, or without nationality, and is unable or unwilling to return to, and is unable or unwilling to avail himself or herself of the protection of, that country because of persecution or a well-founded fear of persecution on account of race, religion, nationality, membership in a particular social group, or political opinion. This was necessary to guarantee the United States followed the definition used by the 1951 Refugee Convention. so that American law was in line with international law.

The annual admission of refugees is set to a 50,000 cap per fiscal year, but in an emergency situation, the President may change the number for a period of twelve months. The Attorney General is also granted power to admit additional refugees and grant asylum to current aliens, but all admissions must be reported to Congress and be limited to 5,000 people.

The Act created the position of U.S. Coordinator for Refugee Affairs who was initially responsible to the president for the development of overall US refugee admission and resettlement policy. However, the agency that now coordinates these issues is the Department of State’s Bureau of Population, Refugees, and Migration (PRM). A critical part of this responsibility is determining which individuals or groups from among the millions of refugees worldwide will have access to the USRAP. PRM coordinates within the Department of State, as well as with DHS USCIS and other agencies, in carrying out this responsibility.

Title IV of the Immigration and Nationality Act was amended here when the Act created the Office of Refugee Resettlement, which is responsible for funding and administering federal programs for domestic resettlement and assistance to refugees. The office must make available resources for employment training and placement for refugees to be economically self-sufficient, provide opportunities for English language training, ensure cash assistance, and guarantee gender equality in all training and instruction. The Office must also create grants for these projects, consult with state and local governments about sponsorship and distribution of refugees, and develop a system to monitor the use of government funds using evaluations, auditing and data collection. To receive assistance for programs, the States must first explain how they plan to accomplish the goals of these programs, meet the director's standards, and submit a report at the end of each fiscal year.

The Secretary of State was authorized to take on the role from 1980 to 1981, and the new director worked with them to develop and implement programs for existing refugees and eventually took up the position from 1982 onward. The director must submit a congressional report at the end of each fiscal year to committees on the Judiciary of the United States House of Representatives and the United States Senate. The reports should contain information on the geographic location, employment status, and problems of the refugees and also contain suggestions for alternative resettlement strategies. The Office was authorized $200,000,000 during 1980 and 1981, and that number is now decided at the beginning of each fiscal year based on the results received at the end of each year.

However, not all states have resettlement programs; Wyoming has the distinction of being the only U.S. state that has never resettled refugees.

== History ==
It was only after World War II that the United States began to differentiate the term "refugee" from "immigrant" and began creating policy that dealt specifically with refugees while working outside of immigration policy. Early action came in the form of the Displaced Persons Act of 1948, the Refugee Relief Act of 1953, and the Refugee-Escapee Act of 1957. The Immigration and Nationality Act of 1952, which was later amended in 1965 to include policy for refugees on a case-by-case basis, was the first Act that consolidated U.S. immigration policy into one body of text.

The creation of the Refugee Act began with hearings by the United States Senate Judiciary Subcommittee on Immigration, Refugees and Border Security from 1965 to 1968, which recommended for Congress create a uniform system for refugees, but received little support. Edward Kennedy began writing to propose a bill to reform refugee policy in 1978 and first introduced the idea to the United States Senate in 1979. With his proposal, he hoped to address the need for a reformed policy that was not specifically designed for people from communist regimes in Eastern Europe or repressive governments in the Middle East, as it was in the past. At the time, there was an average of 200,000 refugees coming to the United States, most of which were Indochinese and Soviet Jews. The cost of resettlement was close to $4000, but most refugees eventually paid that amount in federal income taxes.

The House version of the bill did not have as easy a path as Kennedy's Senate bill, but ultimately both bills achieved synchronicity through a conference committee vote of 207 to 192 on March 4, 1980. One key element of the House bill, was a legislative veto if the president requested more than 50,000 refugee admissions, but this feature was removed from the final version that went to the conference report.

Many Americans feared a floodgate scenario with a large and sudden increase of the refugee population, but the 50,000 cap would account for only 10% of immigration flow to the U.S. and would allow one refugee for every 4000 Americans, small numbers compared to those of countries like Canada, France, and Australia. The bill was adopted by the Senate by a unanimous vote on September 6, 1979, and it remained essentially intact until it was signed in 1980. However, not long after, the United States was hit with an influx of Cuban refugees as a result of the Mariel boatlift, about 115,000 Cuban refugees arrived in Florida. This caused the administration to temporarily pause the use of the act. On April 14, 1980, President Carter signed an executive order for the emergency provisions of the Refugee Act to respond to an appeal on behalf of 12,000 Cubans in Havana. The United States welcomed 3,500 Cubans after partaking in international resettlement efforts. Eventually the Cuban refugee influx was significantly controlled to the point where the United States was able to return to the practice of the Refugee Act.

== Legacy ==
In 2020, HIAS commemorated the Refugee Act with the following statement:

"Fortieth birthdays are opportunities to celebrate one’s hard-earned accomplishments and an opportunity to look ahead to what the future might bring. It is no different for the United States Refugee Act of 1980, the landmark piece of legislation that established the contemporary U.S. refugee resettlement program and asylum system. Nearly 40 years ago President Jimmy Carter signed the Act into law–March 17, 1980. It is a good time to remember what this legislation has meant to our country."

Between 1975 and 2023 (Sept. 30th), the United States accepted 3,552,558 refugees from every continent except Antarctica. Although there were years where the government accepted fewer than the 50,000 refugee-ceiling cap set by the 1980 Act, those often followed specific events. For example, 146,158 refugees were admitted in 1975, but certain states felt overwhelmed by the numbers, so admissions fell to 27,206 in 1976. Admissions also dropped from 69,886 in 2001 to 27,131 in 2002, ostensibly due to post-9/11 restrictionist policies. President George H. W. Bush had the highest number of admissions per year for a presidential term (just under 120,000) and the only president to lower the refugee ceiling was President Donald Trump during his first term.
