= Immigration and Nationality Technical Corrections Act of 1994 =

Act by the US Congress

- Long title: An Act To amend title III of the Immigration and Nationality Act to make changes in the laws relating to nationality and naturalization.
- Acronyms (colloquial): INTCA
- Enacted by: the 103rd United States Congress
- Effective: October 25, 1994

Citations
- Public law: Pub. L. 103–416
- Statutes at Large: 108 Stat. 4305

Codification
- Acts amended: Immigration and Nationality Act of 1952; Immigration Act of 1990

Legislative history
- Introduced in the House as H.R. 783 by Rep. Romano L. Mazzoli (D-KY) on February 3, 1993; Committee consideration by House Judiciary Committee, Subcommittee on International Law, Immigration, and Refugees; Signed into law by President Bill Clinton on October 25, 1994

The Immigration and Nationality Technical Corrections Act of 1994 (INTCA or H.R. 783), Pub. L. 103–416, 108 Stat. 4305, enacted October 25, 1994, was an act by the United States Congress "to amend title III of the Immigration and Nationality Act to make changes in the laws relating to nationality and naturalization." Introduced by Romano Mazzoli, the act amended the Immigration and Nationality Act by allowing the acquisition of United States citizenship from either parent for persons born abroad to parents, only one of whom is a United States citizen.

The INTCA also prospectively expanded the definition of "aggravated felony", under which non-citizens were subject to deportation, by adding more criminal convictions. Some of these new additions related to crime of violence, theft, ransom, child pornography, racketeering, prostitution, tax evasion, fraud and alien smuggling.

The act was signed into law by President Bill Clinton, who said in his signing statement that act would correct the injustice towards persons born outside of the United States, and only one of whose parents was a United States citizen. Prior to the act, such persons could only acquire citizenship if that parent was the father. The act amended this condition to allow acquisition of US citizenship when either of the parents was a US citizen.

== See also ==
- Anti-Drug Abuse Act of 1988
- Immigration Act of 1990
- Antiterrorism and Effective Death Penalty Act of 1996 (AEDPA)
- Illegal Immigration Reform and Immigrant Responsibility Act of 1996 (IIRIRA)
