= Refugee Relief Act =

1953 American law

- Other short titles: Special Migration Act of 1953
- Long title: An Act for the relief of certain refugees, and orphans, and for other purposes.
- Nicknames: Refugee Relief Act of 1953
- Enacted by: the 83rd United States Congress
- Effective: August 7, 1953

Citations
- Public law: 83-203
- Statutes at Large: 67 Stat. 400

Codification
- Titles amended: 8 U.S.C.: Aliens and Nationality
- U.S.C. sections amended: 8 U.S.C. ch. 12, subch. I §§ 1101 & 1104; 8 U.S.C. ch. 12, subch. II §§ 1153, 1182, 1252, 1253, 1351

Legislative history
- Introduced in the House as H.R. 6481 by Louis E. Graham (R–PA) on July 27, 1953; Committee consideration by House Judiciary; Passed the House on July 28, 1953 (221-185); Passed the Senate on July 29, 1953 (63-30); Reported by the joint conference committee on July 29, 1953; agreed to by the House on July 31, 1953 (Agreed) and by the Senate on August 1, 1953 (Agreed); Signed into law by President Dwight D. Eisenhower on August 7, 1953

On August 7, 1953, President Eisenhower signed the Refugee Relief Act of 1953, also known as the Emergency Migration Act, into law to provide relief for certain refugees, orphans, and other purposes. This act was mainly intended for people from Southern Europe barred due to the numerical limits from the quotas under the Immigration and Nationality Act of 1952, widely known as the McCarran-Walter Act.

The Refugee Relief Act of 1953 was the United States' second refugee admissions and resettlement law, following the Displaced Persons Act of 1948, which expired at the end of 1952. Under this act, 214,000 immigrants were admitted to the United States, including 60,000 Italians, 17,000 Greeks, 17,000 Dutch, and 45,000 immigrants from communist countries. The act was designed to aid those fleeing European Communist countries, like the Soviet Union and Eastern Germany.

== History ==
In the 1950s, the United States encouraged people to leave European Communist countries. Since the McCarran-Walter Act (1952) did not include provisions for refugees as a general category, the policy continued to be carried out by way of impromptu measures. Moreover, many people thought that the McCarran-Walter Act was unjust and inadequate in coping with the problem of refugees. Hence, the Refugee Relief Act of 1953 was enacted in August 1953 and expired in 1956 to circumnavigate the low quotas for people's respective countries.

Senator Arthur V. Watkins of Utah was the original author of this act. Later, Senator Pat McCarran (D-Nev.) renamed the bill. At McCarran's discretion, there were multiple provisions, complicating the determination of eligibility of applicants. These amendments required prospective refugees to undergo a thorough security screening, including a verifiable history of their activities for two years prior to application. The final form of the Refugee Relief Act provided a token redemption of Eisenhower's administration, promising more liberal immigration policy and avoiding the complications of the McCarran-Walter Act.

The bill passed the House of Representatives by a vote of 221 to 185, with the support of most Democrats and an even split among Republicans. The bill later passed the United States Senate on a voice vote, with Senator McCarran opposing. On August 7, 1953, President Eisenhower signed the act into law. In a statement about signing the Refugee Act of 1953, President Eisenhower stated that "In enacting this legislation, we are giving a new chance in life to 214,000 fellow humans. This action demonstrates again America’s traditional concern for the homeless, the persecuted and the less fortunate of other lands. It is a dramatic contrast to the tragic events taking place in East Germany and in other captive nations". Overall, the President viewed this emergency immigration legislation as a significant humanitarian act that would contribute toward a greater understanding and better cooperation between free nations of the world.

== Provisions of the law ==
The Refugee Relief Act of 1953 intended to help refugees escape from Communist persecution, natural disaster, and military operations by allowing them to come into the United States as immigrants. Furthermore, the act also addressed the problems resulting from population pressures in Italy, Greece, and Netherlands by extending immigration to relatives of American citizens and permanent resident aliens. Another main focus of this act was including immigration of orphans and permitting certain aliens already in the United States as nonimmigrants to become permanent residents of the United States. In short, the Refugee Relief Act of 1953 permitted 214,000 immigrants without being subject to the quota limitations under the McCarran-Walter Act.

The following is a list of distinct groups of non-citizens who benefited from the Refugee Relief Act of 1953: refugees, escapees, and German expellees. The Act defined Refugees as people "... in a country or area which is neither Communist nor Communist-dominated, who because of persecution, fear of persecution, natural calamity or military operations is out of his usual place of abode and unable to return thereto, who has not been firmly resettled, and who is in urgent need of assistance for the essentials of life or for transportation". In other words, refugees are people who lack "the essentials of life." Escapees are refugees who fled from the Union of the Soviet Socialist Republics or other Communist areas of Europe due to persecution or fear of persecution based on race, religion, or political opinion cannot return. Finally, German Expellees are refugees of German ethnic origin living in the German Federal Republic, western sector of Berlin, or in Austria who was born and forcibly removed from the following countries: Albania, Bulgaria, Czechoslovakia, Soviet Socialist Republics, Yugoslavia, or places under the control of those countries expect a part of Germany where the Soviet military occupies.

The Act lists the allocation of special non-quota visas. For instance, 186,000 out of 214,000 were refugees, expellees, and escapees from Communist persecution, natural disaster, and military operations, both in Europe and Asia, making it the largest recipient group. More specifically, the Act issues 90,000 visas to refugees, escapees, and expellees in the German Federal Republic, the Western Sector of Berlin, or in Austria; 10,000 visas to escapees in the member nations of the North Atlantic Treaty Organization or Turkey, Sweden, Iran, or the Free Territory of Trieste; 45,000 visa to refugees in Italy; 15,000 visas to refugees in Greece, 15,000 visas to refugees in the Netherlands; 2,000 visas in the Near East; 5,000 visas to refugees in the Far East, and another 2,000 each to Polish veterans and Chinese refugees regardless of their place of residence at the time of visa application. Section 12 prioritized "persons whose services or skills are needed in the United States," and the parents, spouses, and children of U.S. citizens.

Another component of the Refugee Relief Act of 1953 was the immigration of orphans. The Act states that no more than four thousand eligible orphans in any part of the world, adopted abroad or adopted in the United States by an American citizen and spouse, may be issued immigrant visas under the Refugee Relief Act.

In order to be eligible for admission, refugees were required to evidence a guarantee of a home and job by a U.S. resident. Applicants had to verify their political history, meaning they had to prove their opposition of Communism. Moreover, they had to receive a sponsorship from a U.S. citizen who would ensure who they claimed to be on their special assurance forms, prepared by the Department of State. Applicants also had to pre-arrange employment in the United States, provide guarantees that they would return to their country if expelled from the United States, and pay for their travel costs.

== Impacts of the Law ==
Due to the Refugee Relief Act of 1953, several thousand Chinese residing in the United States on or before August 7, 1953, were eligible for adjustment of status to permanent residence and citizenship. Moreover, the Act resulted in the entry of 2,777 Chinese refugees.

In 1955, Edward Corsi, who had been appointed to administer the act, was dismissed as the result of a conflict with State Department Security Director Scott McLeod. Representative Francis Walter accused Corsi of association with a Communist-affiliated group. Corsi said that the administration of the act was hampered by an obsessive "psychology of security", and the refugees were being "investigated to death".
