= Zadvydas v. Davis =

- Supreme Court of the United States

Argued February 21, 2001 Decided June 28, 2001
- Full case name: Kestutis Zadvydas v. Christine G. Davis and Immigration and Naturalization Service, John D. Ashcroft, Attorney General, et al.
- Citations: 533 U.S. 678 (more) 121 S. Ct. 2491; 150 L. Ed. 2d 653
- Argument: Oral argument

Case history
- Prior: Zadvydas v. Caplinger, 986 F. Supp. 1011 (E.D. La. 1997), reversed sub nom. Zadvydas v. Underdown, 185 F.3d 279 (5th Cir. 1999); cert. granted, 531 U.S. 923 (2000); Phan v. Reno, 56 F. Supp. 2d 1149 (W.D. Wash. 1999); affirmed, Ma v. Reno, 208 F.3d 815 (9th Cir. 2000); cert. granted, 531 U.S. 924 (2000)
- Subsequent: Zadvydas v. Davis, 285 F.3d 398 (5th Cir. 2002); Ma v. Ashcroft, 257 F.3d 1095 (9th Cir. 2001)

Holding
- Detention of unremoveable admitted immigrants cannot exceed six months unless removal is in the foreseeable future or if there are other special circumstances.

Court membership
- Chief Justice William Rehnquist Associate Justices John P. Stevens · Sandra Day O'Connor; Antonin Scalia · Anthony Kennedy; David Souter · Clarence Thomas; Ruth Bader Ginsburg · Stephen Breyer

Case opinions
- Majority: Breyer, joined by Stevens, O'Connor, Souter, Ginsburg
- Dissent: Scalia, joined by Thomas
- Dissent: Kennedy, joined by Rehnquist; Scalia, Thomas (Part I)

Laws applied
- U.S. Const. amend. V Illegal Immigration Reform and Immigrant Responsibility Act, 8 U.S.C. § 1231(a)(6),28 U.S.C. § 2241(c)(3)

Zadvydas v. Davis (/zædˈwiːdæs/ zad-WEE-das), 533 U.S. 678 (2001), was a case decided by the Supreme Court of the United States. The court ruled narrowly that section 241 of the Immigration and Nationality Act of 1952 (8 U.S.C. § 1231) contains an implicit time limitation and did not authorize indefinite detention of foreigners that no other country would accept.

== Background ==
Controversy over the prolonged detention of foreigners pending deportation was ongoing for twenty years prior to the Zadvydas case. The initial litigation over this issue arose in connection with the detention of Cubans who committed crimes after being paroled into the United States during the Mariel boatlift. The case law of the United States courts of appeals was split. Some circuits ruled that these detentions were unjustified while other circuits upheld such detentions, citing Shaughnessy v. United States ex rel. Mezei (1953).

In 1996, major changes occurred in United States immigration and nationality law, with the passage of the Antiterrorism and Effective Death Penalty Act of 1996 (AEDPA) and the Illegal Immigration Reform and Immigrant Responsibility Act of 1996 (IIRAIRA). These two laws purported to enable the detention of removable foreigners under section 241 of the Immigration and Nationality Act of 1952 (8 U.S.C. § 1231) beyond the removal period, without any express time limitation in the text thereof.

== Lower courts ==
The Fifth Circuit ruled that Zadvydas' detention did not violate the Constitution as long as good faith efforts to remove him continued. In a separate case, the Ninth Circuit ruled that Kim Ho Ma could not be detained beyond the 90-day removal period. The court granted certiorari in both cases and consolidated the cases for the hearing.

=== Fifth Circuit case ===
Kestutis Zadvydas was a lawful permanent resident in the United States who was ordered to be deported in 1994 based on his criminal record. Zadvydas was admitted to the United States in 1956 when he was 8 years old. He was born in a displaced persons camp in Germany after World War II to parents originally from Lithuania. In 1966 he was convicted in Queens, New York of attempted robbery and in 1974 he was convicted for attempted burglary. He failed to appear before the immigration judge for a deportation hearing. In 1992 he was convicted in Virginia for possession of 474 grams of cocaine with intent to distribute. Upon release from prison, he was taken into INS custody and was ordered deported to Germany. In September 1995 after Lithuania and Germany had refused to accept Zadvydas, he filed a petition for a writ of habeas corpus in U.S. District Court. In October 1997 the District Court granted the writ and ordered him released under supervision.

The district court opinion was one of the first after IIRIRA to consider a habeas challenge from an alien who could not be removed because no country agreed to accept him. The district court decided that mandatory detention of potentially indefinite duration (under the earlier version of Title 8 and IIRIRA's Transitional custody rules) violated the detainee's rights because "Congress did not contemplate permanent detention as a means of punishment for aliens convicted of aggravated felonies who have already served their sentence".

The government appealed and the Fifth Circuit Court of Appeals overturned the district court.

=== Ninth Circuit case ===
Kim Ho Ma was a Cambodian, also a resident alien in the United States. At age 17, Kim was convicted of manslaughter and was ordered deported. Cambodia did not have a treaty with the United States and would not accept Kim. In 1999, Kim filed a petition for a writ of habeas corpus in U.S. District Court. A five-judge panel of that court considered Kim's case in connection with about 100 other cases and ordered him released. The government appealed and the Ninth Circuit Court of Appeals upheld the district court.

== Supreme Court ==
=== Oral argument ===
Robert F. Barnard argued the case for Zadvydas. Jay W. Stansell argued the case for Kim. Representing the United States was Deputy Solicitor General Edwin Kneedler. Amicus curiae briefs were filed by the Washington Legal Foundation on behalf of the government in the Zadvydas case and by the Legal Immigration Network, Inc., the American Association of Jews from the former USSR, the Lawyers Committee for Human Rights, the American Civil Liberties Union, Human Rights Watch, and Carolyn Patty Blum, et al., on behalf of Kim.

=== Majority opinion ===
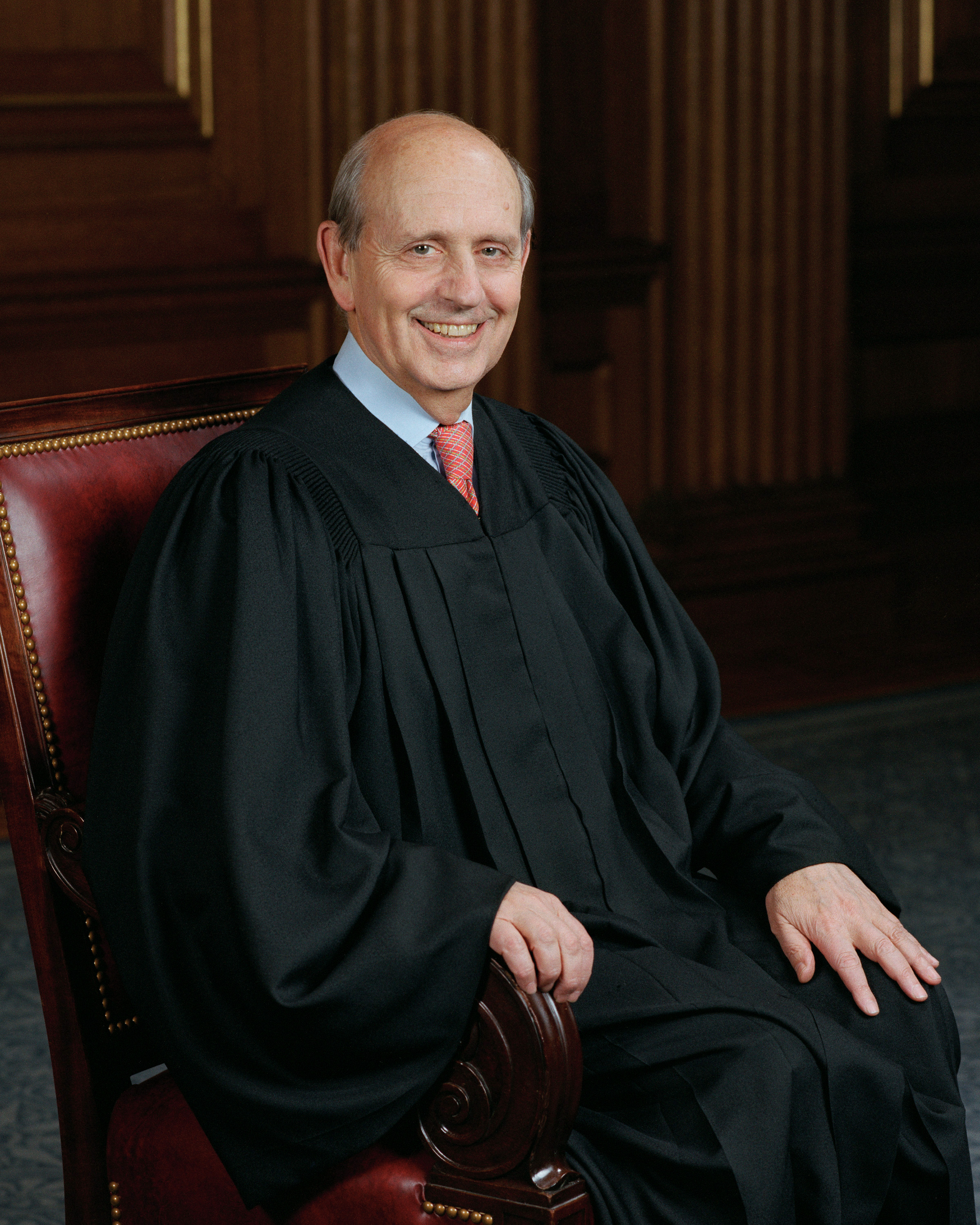
Justice Stephen Breyer, author of the majority opinion

Justice Stephen Breyer delivered the opinion of the court. The statute was challenged for granting the Attorney General authority to detain a deportee past the term of the 90-day removal period. Breyer applied the doctrine of constitutional avoidance to interpret the statute as containing an implicit time limitation, stating that: "[T]he statute, read in light of the Constitution's demands...does not permit indefinite detention".

The government asserted two regulatory interests. The government's interest in "ensuring the appearance of aliens at future immigration proceedings" was "weak", the Court said, when "removal seems a remote possibility". The second interest, to protect the public from a dangerous or violent detainee, required "strong procedural protections" for case-by-case review. In both cases the Circuit Courts made note of INS determinations that the detained aliens were considered dangerous. Zadvydas and Ma did not challenge the finding of dangerousness. They only argued that they could not be detained indefinitely simply because no country would agree to accept them. The Court held that detention for up to six months after entry of a removal order is "presumptively reasonable".

The Court distinguished Shaughnessy v. United States ex rel. Mezei (1953) because the person in that case was detained at Ellis Island after being denied entry. The Court said the distinction between excludable and deportable aliens "runs throughout immigration law". Without carving out an exception, the Court acknowledged in dicta that the case does not decide "special circumstances" arguments "for heightened deference to the judgments of the political branches with respect to national security."

=== Dissenting opinions ===
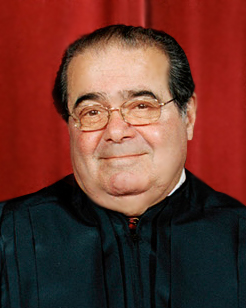
Justice Antonin Scalia, author of one of the dissenting opinions

Justice Antonin Scalia dissented from the majority. Scalia stated that an alien who has no legal right to be in the United States has no right to release into the country that is trying to expel him or her. Scalia quoted Justice Robert H. Jackson in his dissent, asserting that "Due process does not invest any alien with a right to enter the United States, nor confer on those admitted the right to remain against the national will." [italics in original]

Justice Anthony Kennedy's dissent was joined by Thomas, Scalia and Chief Justice William Rehnquist. Kennedy said Mezei presented a "line-drawing problem"; unlawful (removable) aliens like Zadvydas "who face a final order to removal" may be in a different class than aliens seeking entry, however, the dissenters said the plenary "power to admit or exclude aliens is a sovereign prerogative" that applies anyhow. Kennedy said the majority misapplied the principle of constitutional avoidance by circumventing congressional intent and imposing a six-month limit on detention that was not found in the statute.

== Subsequent developments ==
=== Repatriation of Kim Ho Ma ===
Following the 2002 signing of a repatriation agreement between Cambodia and the United States, Kim Ho Ma was deported. As of 2007, he lived in a rural area of Cambodia with his wife.

=== Clark v. Martinez ===
Over 1000 inadmissible aliens (including the Mariel boatlift Cubans) remained in detention beyond the six-month time frame set by the Court in Zadvydas and unlikely to be repatriated. Justice Scalia, despite his dissent in Zadvydas, authored the 7–2 decision in Clark v. Martinez rejecting the Bush Administration's argument that inadmissible aliens who entered the United States unlawfully could be detained indefinitely under §1231(a)(6).The Supreme Court decided Clark v. Martinez on statutory grounds similar to Zadvydas.

== See also ==
- List of United States Supreme Court cases, volume 533
