= Migration and Refugee Assistance Act =

Migration and Refugee Assistance Act of 1962
- Other short titles: MRAA
- Long title: An Act To enable the United States to participate in the assistance rendered to certain migrants and refugees.
- Acronyms (colloquial): MRAA
- Enacted by: the 87th United States Congress
- Effective: June 28, 1962

Citations
- Public law: Public Law 87-510
- Statutes at Large: 76 Stat. 121

Codification
- Acts amended: Fair Share Refugee Act of 1960
- U.S.C. sections created: 22 U.S.C. ch. 36 (§ 2601 et seq.)
- U.S.C. sections amended: 8 U.S.C. § 1404

Legislative history
- Introduced in the House as H.R. 8291 by D‑NY Francis E. Walterth on June 20, 1961; Committee consideration by House Committee on the Judiciary · Senate Committee on Foreign Relations; Passed the House on September 6, 1961 (Voice vote); Passed the Senate on September 15, 1961 (Voice vote); Reported by the joint conference committee on June 1962; agreed to by the House on June 27, 1962 (Agreed to conference report) and by the Senate on June 27, 1962 (Agreed to conference report); Signed into law by President John F. Kennedy on June 28, 1962

Major amendments
- Indochina Migration and Refugee Assistance Act of 1975

The Migration and Refugee Assistance Act was passed by the 87th United States Congress in 1962 and signed into law by President John F. Kennedy to deal with unexpected and urgent needs of refugees, displaced persons, conflict victims, and other persons at risk around the globe.

The Act was brought into force during the Clinton administration in 2001 to deal with the crises in the Balkans and Nepal.

The Act was cited by President Barack Obama in 2009 to authorize money up to $20.3 million related to needs of Palestinian refugees and conflict victims in Gaza.
