= Immigration Act of 1990 =

United States immigration law

- Long title: An Act to amend the Immigration and Nationality Act to change the level, and preference system for admission, of immigrants to the United States, and to provide for administrative naturalization, and for other purposes.
- Enacted by: the 101st United States Congress

Citations
- Public law: Pub. L. 101–649
- Statutes at Large: 104 Stat. 4978

Codification
- Titles amended: 8 U.S.C.: Aliens and Nationality
- U.S.C. sections amended: 8 U.S.C. ch. 12 § 1101 et seq.

Legislative history
- Introduced in the Senate as S. 358 by Ted Kennedy (D–MA) on February 7, 1989; Committee consideration by Senate Judiciary, House Judiciary; Passed the Senate on July 13, 1989 (81–17); Passed the House on October 3, 1990 (unanimous consent in lieu of H.R. 4300, passed 231–192); Reported by the joint conference committee on October 26, 1990; agreed to by the Senate on October 26, 1990 (89–8) and by the House on October 27, 1990 (264–118); Signed into law by President George H. W. Bush on November 29, 1990

Major amendments
- Immigration and Nationality Technical Corrections Act of 1994

The Immigration Act of 1990 (Pub. L. 101–649, 104 Stat. 4978, enacted November 29, 1990) was signed into law by President George H. W. Bush on November 29, 1990. It was first introduced by Senator Ted Kennedy in 1989. It was a national reform of the Immigration and Nationality Act of 1965. It increased total, overall immigration to allow 700,000 immigrants to come to the U.S. per year for the fiscal years 1992–94, and 675,000 per year after that. It provided a family-based immigration visa, created five distinct employment based visas, categorized by occupation, and a diversity visa program that created a lottery to admit immigrants from "low admittance" countries or countries whose citizenry was underrepresented in the U.S.

Besides these immigrant visas there were also changes in nonimmigrant visas like the H-1B visa for highly skilled workers. There were also cutbacks in the allotment of visas available for extended relatives. Congress also created the temporary protected status (TPS visa), which the Attorney General may provide to immigrants who are temporarily unable to safely return to their home country because of ongoing armed conflict, an environmental disaster, or other extraordinary and temporary condition. It specifically benefited citizens of El Salvador.

The act also lifted the English testing process for naturalization that had been imposed in the Naturalization Act of 1906 for permanent residents who are over 55 and have been living in the United States for fifteen years as a permanent resident, and eliminated exclusion of homosexuals under the medically unsound classification of "sexual deviant" that was in the 1965 Act. George H. W. Bush is quoted as saying, "I am also pleased to note that this Act facilitates immigration not just in numerical terms, but also in terms of basic entry rights of those beyond our borders."

== Background ==
Prior to the introduction of the Immigration Act of 1990, there was discussion in Congress concerning immigration reform, particularly on the number of immigrants that were allowed to enter the United States. In 1988, the House voted against a proposal that would limit the number of immigrants' family members who could enter the United States. With the system at the time allowing for unlimited family members to enter, immigration reform opponent groups largely contended with the allowance of this system. The Senate then debated immigration reform in 1989, before Ted Kennedy proposed the Immigration Act of 1990, which continued family-based immigrant visas.

The most significant provision of the Immigration Act of 1990 was the increase in immigrants that were allowed to come into the US: Title I, Sec. 104, which increased the number of asylees able to enter the country. In this same title, the bill allowed for an increase in family-based, as well as visa-based immigration.

Compared to the bill's initial introduction in the Senate, the final draft's ultimate objective differed little from what was intended. However, wording of the law's official draft varied considerably from the original. For example, in the final version's antecedent, provisions contained numerous specific immigration caps for different categories, instead of the simple 675,000 per year found in the law. Much of this language used in Title I was eliminated in the Act's final form.

== Family reunification ==
Family reunification remained a priority as it had been in the Immigration and Nationality Act of 1965. The 1990 Act expanded the number of family-based immigration visas allotted per year to 480,000 but also made the definition of family more exclusive by limiting it to immediate family members.

== Employment-based immigration ==
Employment-based immigration was divided amongst five occupational categories in the 1990 Immigration Act (the 1965 Act had only two). The Act provided 140,000 visas per year for job-based immigration. These categories were:

- EB-1 visa (for an alien of extraordinary ability)
- EB-2 visa
- EB-3 visa
- EB-4 visa
- EB-5 visa

The EB 4 visa is vague but has to do with religious workers who wish to continue their career in the US. The distinct category exists because the other visas require employer contact and labor certification through the US Department of Labor, and the religious worker visa applicant is not strictly limited to employer-sponsored entry.

In addition to having to be employer-sponsored, the foreigner usually must be applying to work in an area of labor shortage in the US, or the employer must bargain on the foreigner's behalf and prove that it exhausted all other domestic recruiting efforts.

== Diversity Immigrant Visas ==
Diversity Immigrant Visa was a new, important facet of the amendment was for the first time been instituted in national immigration policy. "Starting in 1991, every year the Attorney General, decides from information gathered over the most recent five year period the regions or country that are considered High Admission or Low Admission States" from that analysis, citizens of certain nations are deemed eligible or ineligible to apply for a diversity visa. "A High Admission region or country is one that has had 50,000 immigrants or more acquire a permanent residency visa. The High Admission regions are not given visas under this act in order to promote diversity." Starting in fiscal year 1995, the cap of 55,000 visas were allotted as "diversity" visas. The number is now more around 50,000. Changes have been made to the diversity visa requirements almost every other year (if not more often) since 1990 to assess which countries qualify. In 1990 the qualifying countries were Albania, Algeria, Argentina, Austria, Belgium, Czech Republic, Slovakia, Denmark, Estonia, Finland, France (including Guadeloupe and New Caledonia), Germany, Hungary, Iceland, Indonesia, Ireland, Italy, Japan, Latvia, Liechtenstein, Lithuania, Luxembourg, Monaco, the Netherlands, Norway, Poland, San Marino, Sweden, Switzerland and Tunisia and the United Kingdom (including Bermuda and Gibraltar). There are a number of qualifications to obtaining this visa besides being from one of the qualifying zones. Applicants must:

- Have a high school diploma; or
- Have two years' work experience and two years' job training

In addition, the SOS keeps track of age, occupation, education, etc. of all immigrants obtaining this visa. The selection of qualifying applicants is random. Someone approved and granted a visa has family unification extend to such visa holders. Children and spouses are eligible for permanent residency. The policy, notably, positively affected displaced Tibetans from 1991 to 1994, who were given 1,000 visas per year.

== Non-immigrant visas ==
Controversy over the immigration act of 1990 stemmed mostly from the expansion of green cards for foreign laborers and new limits on access to temporary visas such as the H-1B visa for visiting scholars. A bulletin released by the Stanford University News Service in Sept. 1991 claims that "Stanford, and other universities, will have to do more paperwork to hire short-term visiting professors and researchers under the H-1 visa program."

The bill also introduced a cap of 65,000 per year to H-1B and excluded nurses, entertainers, athletes, and artists from qualifying. Another short term visa is "D" category nonimmigrants who work "aboard sea or air carriers or as longshore workers" to which more constraints were also added to their ability to obtain visas.

However, it also created new categories of nonimmigrant visas. The O and P categories were for extraordinarily skilled foreigners in the realm of entertainment, athletics, science, etc. Their admittance depended upon "consultation with the appropriate unions", usually who are asking them to the U.S. and their time allowed here depended on how long the event/activity they were participating in lasted.

== Provisions of the Act ==
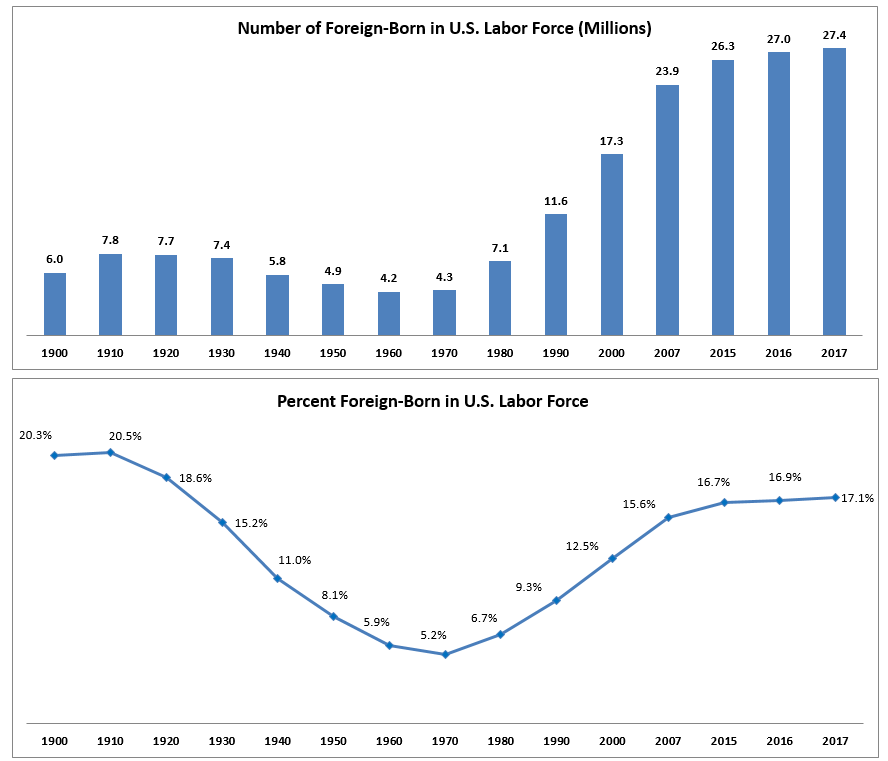
Foreign-born in U.S. labor force 1900–2015

The Act generally retained the preference for family reunification immigration, but placed additional emphasis on employment-related immigration and created a category of immigrants from countries underrepresented in the immigrant pool. Specific provisions of the Act:

- Raised the cap on immigration from 270,000 people annually to 675,000 annually, and 700,000 for the first three years after the Act's enactment, and increased the per-country immigrant visa cap to 25,600 (from 20,000).
- For family-sponsored visas, set an annual minimum of 226,000, and a maximum set by a formula that generally yielded between 421,000 and 675,000.
- Created the diversity immigrant category for immigrants from underrepresented countries (those with fewer than 50,000 immigrants admissions over the preceding five years); since fiscal year 1995 this category (later called the Diversity Immigrant Visa category) has been allocated 55,000 visas each year.
- Granted Temporary Protected Status for Salvadorians fleeing violence in the Salvadoran Civil War;
- Provided for the hiring of 1,000 additional U.S. Border Patrol agents, increased penalties for violations of immigration law, and expedited deportation proceedings
- Amended the "medical exclusion" provisions of the Immigration and National Act to eliminate text that let agents exclude "suspected homosexuals", and removed the psychopathic personality and mental defect language that had been used for decades to exclude suspected homosexuals.
- Extension of the visa waiver program that allows immigrants who do not have a visa to enter the country.
- Workers rights for aliens in regards to “longshore work.” Meaning you can not force immigrants to engage in manual labor (i.e. loading and unloading cargo) in exchange of bringing them to the US.
- The introduction of new professions that immigrants can qualify as in order to acquire a work visa. These professions include things like athletes, entertainers, and those who have religious occupations. These provisions ultimately allow more immigrants to enter the US legally.
- Criminal aliens were required to be reported by state court system to provide information to the Immigration and Naturalization Service (INS) on convicted aliens. Which allowed the INS to have authority to arrest aliens who are believed to commit felonies.
- There was enhanced enforcement which provided repair and construction of borders to deter illegal entry on the US borders. It also increased the amount of 1,000 border patrol officers of the INS. The INS created new penalties for immigrants who were found guilty of using fraudulent documentations for immigration purpose.
- There was deportation procedure added that required to give notice to aliens that are subject to deportation such as date of hearing and possible defense. Aliens were mandates to inform the INS their address. If the alien fails to do so they would be ordered to be deported in absentia. Which required the attorney general to issues a report to Congress on expediting the deportation procedure.

== Legislative history ==
- February 1989: Introduced in the Senate.
- July 3, 1989: Conversation about the number of immigrants flowing into the US and if there should be a limit on the number of immigrants coming in.
- July 11–13, 1989: 4300 House version.
- July 1989: Senate debates bill.
- House Hearings: September 27, 1989 and February 21, 1990, then 4 hearings in March.
- October 2–3, 1990: Debated 4300, then passed the Senate bill, but inserted the House text.
- Senate hearings: March 3, 1989.
- October 3, 1990: Debate takes place in the House for the bill.
- October 3, 1990: More extensive article of the debate mentioned above.
- October 4, 1990: Bill is passed in the House.
- October 7, 1990: Reaction of immigrants supporting the bill.
- November 29, 1990: Signed into law by George H. W. Bush.

== Jordan Commission ==
Following the passage of this act, there were more immigrants admitted to the U.S. from 1991 to 2000 than any prior decade in U.S. history with 10–11 million documented entries.

This act also led to the creation of the Jordan Commission or the U.S. Commission on Immigration Reform. The Commission released four reports covering every aspect of U.S. Immigration policy and evaluated its quality and effectiveness, making recommendations based on their findings.

The report concluded with the following statement of principles: "Properly-regulated immigration and immigrant policy serves the national interest by ensuring the entry of those who will contribute most to our society and helping lawful newcomers adjust to life in the United States. It must give due consideration to shifting economic realities. A well-regulated system sets priorities for admission; facilitates nuclear family reunification; gives employers access to a global labor market while protecting U.S. workers; helps to generate jobs and economic growth; and fulfills our commitment to resettle refugees as one of several elements of humanitarian protection of the persecuted."
