= Immigration and Nationality Act of 1952 =

American immigration law

- Long title: An Act to revise the laws relating to immigration, naturalization, and nationality; and for other purposes.
- Acronyms (colloquial): INA
- Nicknames: McCarran–Walter Act
- Enacted by: the 82nd United States Congress
- Effective: June 27, 1952

Citations
- Public law: 82-414
- Statutes at Large: 66 Stat. 163

Codification
- Titles amended: 8 U.S.C.: Aliens and Nationality
- U.S.C. sections created: 8 U.S.C. ch. 12

Legislative history
- Introduced in the House as H.R. 5678 by Francis E. Walter (D-PA) on October 9, 1951; Passed the House on April 25, 1952 (206–68); Passed the Senate on May 22, 1952 (voice vote); Reported by the joint conference committee on May 23, 1952; agreed to by the House on June 10, 1952 (302–53) and by the Senate on June 11, 1952 (voice vote); Vetoed by President Harry S. Truman on June 25, 1952; Overridden by the House on June 26, 1952 (278–113); Overridden by the Senate and became law on June 27, 1952 (57–26)

Major amendments
- Immigration Act of 1990; Immigration and Nationality Technical Corrections Act of 1994; Illegal Immigration Reform and Immigrant Responsibility Act of 1996; USA PATRIOT Act; Laken Riley Act

United States Supreme Court cases
- Abel v. United States, 362 U.S. 217 (1960)

The Immigration and Nationality Act of 1952 (Pub. L. 82–414, ch. 477, 66 Stat. 163, enacted June 17, 1952), also known as the McCarran–Walter Act, codified under Title 8 of the United States Code (8 U.S.C. ch. 12), governs immigration to and citizenship in the United States. It came into effect on June 27, 1952. The legislation consolidated various immigration laws into a single text. Officially titled the Immigration and Nationality Act, it is often referred to as the 1952 law to distinguish it from the 1965 legislation.

This law increased the quota for Europeans outside Northern and Western Europe, gave the United States Department of State authority to reject entries affecting native wages, eliminated 1880s bans on contract labor, set a minimum quota of one hundred visas per country, and promoted family reunification by exempting citizens' children and spouses from numerical caps.

== Legislative history ==
The Immigration and Nationality Act of 1952 was debated and passed in the context of Cold War-era fears and suspicions of infiltrating Soviet and communist spies and sympathizers within American institutions and federal government. Anticommunist sentiment associated with the Second Red Scare (also known as McCarthyism) in the United States led restrictionists to push for selective immigration to preserve national security.

Senator Pat McCarran (D-Nevada), the chairman of the Senate Judiciary Committee, was alarmed by passage and amendment of the Displaced Persons Act, which he believed put the country at risk to “a flood of undesirables,” and he blamed Representative Emanuel Celler, Senator Herbert H. Lehman, and Jewish organizations for its passage. He proposed an immigration bill to maintain the status quo in the United States and to safeguard the country from Communism, "Jewish interests" and immigrants that he deemed as external threats to national security. His immigration bill included restrictive measures such as increased review of potential immigrants, stepped-up deportation, and more stringent naturalization procedures. The bill also placed a preference on economic potential, special skills, and education. In addition, Representative Francis E. Walter (D-Pennsylvania) proposed a similar immigration bill to the House.

In response to the liberal immigration bill of Representative Emanuel Celler (D-New York) and Senator Herbert H. Lehman (D-New York), both McCarran and Walter combined their restrictive immigration proposals into the McCarran–Walter bill and recruited support of patriotic and veteran organizations. However, various immigration reform advocacy groups and testimonies by representatives from ethnic coalitions, civil rights organizations, and labor unions challenged proposals of restrictive immigration and pushed for a more inclusive immigration reform. Opponents of the restrictive bill such as Lehman attempted to strategize a way to bring the groups together to resist McCarran's actions. Despite the efforts to resist, McCarran's influence as chairman of the Senate Judiciary Committee ultimately overpowered the liberal immigration reform coalition.

President Harry Truman vetoed the McCarran–Walter Act because it continued national-origins quotas that discriminated against potential allies that contained communist groups. However, Congress overrode the veto by a two-thirds vote of each house. The 82nd United States Congress enacted the H.R. 5678 bill, which became effective on June 27, 1952. The passage of the McCarran–Walter bill, known as the Immigration and Nationality Act of 1952, solidified more restrictive immigration movement in the United States.

== Provisions ==
The Act abolished racial restrictions found in United States immigration and naturalization statutes going back to the Naturalization Act of 1790. The 1952 Act retained a quota system for nationalities and regions. Eventually, the Act established a preference system that determined which ethnic groups were desirable immigrants and placed great importance on labor qualifications. The Act defined three types of immigrants: immigrants with special skills or who had relatives who were U.S. citizens, who were exempt from quotas and who were to be admitted without restrictions; average immigrants whose numbers were not supposed to exceed 270,000 per year; and refugees.

It expanded the definition of the "United States" for nationality purposes, which already included Puerto Rico and the Virgin Islands, to add Guam. Persons born in these territories on or after December 24, 1952, acquire U.S. citizenship at birth on the same terms as persons born in other parts of the United States.

=== Immigration ===
==== National quotas ====
The McCarran Report of the 1950s supported the quota allocation system of the National Origin Act, asserting that it was the most effective means to "preserve the sociological and cultural balance of the United States". The legislation prioritized Europeans, but due to limited interest in immigration during this time, many visas remained unutilized between 1952 and 1965.

The McCarran–Walter Act abolished the "alien ineligible to citizenship" category from US immigration law, which in practice applied only to people of Asian descent. Quotas of 100 immigrants per country were established for Asian countries; however, people of Asian descent who were citizens of a non-Asian country also counted towards the quota of their ancestral Asian country. Overall immigration from the "Asiatic barred zone" was capped at 2,000 people annually. Passage of the act was strongly lobbied for by the Chinese American Citizens Alliance, Japanese American Citizens League, Filipino Federation of America, and Korean National Association, though only as an incremental measure, as those organizations wished to see national origins quotas abolished altogether.

The McCarran–Walter Act allowed for people of Asian descent to immigrate and to become citizens, which had been banned by laws like the Chinese Exclusion Act of 1882 and Asian Exclusion Act of 1924. Chinese immigration, in particular, had been allowed for a decade prior to McCarran–Walter by the Magnuson Act of 1943, which was passed because of America's World War II alliance with China. Japanese Americans and Korean Americans were first allowed to naturalize by the McCarran–Walter Act. Overall changes in the perceptions of Asians were made possible by Cold War politics; the Displaced Persons Act of 1948 allowed anticommunist Chinese American students who feared returning to the Chinese Civil War to stay in the United States; and these provisions would be expanded by the Refugee Relief Act of 1953.

A key provision, however, authorized the President to overrule those quotas. Section 212(f), states:

Whenever the President finds that the entry of any aliens or of any class of aliens into the United States would be detrimental to the interests of the United States, he may by proclamation, and for such period as he shall deem necessary, suspend the entry of all aliens or any class of aliens as immigrants or nonimmigrants, or impose on the entry of aliens any restrictions he may deem to be appropriate.

===== Quotas by country under successive laws =====
Listed below are historical quotas on immigration from the Eastern Hemisphere, by country, as applied in given fiscal years ending June 30, calculated according to successive immigration laws and revisions from the Emergency Quota Act of 1921, to the final quota year of 1965, as computed under the 1952 Act revisions. Whereas the 1924 Act calculated each country's quota by applying the percentage share of each national origin in the 1920 U.S. population in proportion to the number 150,000, the 1952 Act adopted a simplified formula limiting each country to a flat quota of one-sixth of one percent of that nationality's 1920 population count, with a minimum quota of 100. The 1922 and 1925 systems based on dated census records of the foreign-born population were intended as temporary measures; the National Origins Formula based on the 1920 Census of the total U.S. population took effect on July 1, 1929, with the modifications of McCarran–Walter in effect from 1953 to 1965.

Annual National Quota	Act of 1921		Act of 1924				Act of 1952	
Annual National Quota	1922 (Note: Quota per country limited to 3% of the number of foreign-born persons of that nationality residing in the U.S. in the 1910 census (FY 1922–1924))	%	1925 (Note: Quota per country limited to 2% of the number of foreign-born persons of that nationality residing in the U.S. in the 1890 census (FY 1925–1929))	%	1930 (Note: Quota per nationality limited to a percentage share of 150,000 in a ratio proportional to the number of U.S. inhabitants of that national origin as a share of all U.S. inhabitants in the 1920 census (FY 1930–1952))	%	1965 (Note: Quota per nationality limited to one-sixth of 1% of the number of U.S. inhabitants of that national origin in the 1920 census (FY 1953–1965))	%
Albania	288	0.08%	100	0.06%	100	0.07%	100	0.06%
Armenia (Note: The Socialist Soviet Republic of Armenia was semi-independent from 1920 until March 1922, when it was one of the four founding states of the Soviet Union, but Armenians were awarded visas separately to other Soviet citizens.)	230	0.06%	124	0.08%	100	0.07%	100	0.06%
Austria	7,451	2.08%	785	0.48%	1,413	0.92%	1,405	0.89%
Belgium	1,563	0.44%	512	0.31%	1,304	0.85%	1,297	0.82%
Bulgaria	302	0.08%	100	0.06%	100	0.07%	100	0.06%
Czechoslovakia	14,357	4.01%	3,073	1.87%	2,874	1.87%	2,859	1.80%
Danzig	301	0.08%	228	0.14%	100	0.07%	(Note: The Free City of Danzig was annexed by Germany in 1939 and then awarded to Poland in 1945.)	
Denmark	5,619	1.57%	2,789	1.69%	1,181	0.77%	1,175	0.74%
Estonia	1,348	0.38%	124	0.08%	116	0.08%	115 (Note: The Baltic states (Estonia, Latvia and Lithuania) were occupied and annexed by the Soviet Union from 1944, not regaining independence until 1991, but the U.S. did not recognize this as legitimate and continued to issue visas to citizens of the Baltic states.)	0.07%
Finland	3,921	1.10%	471	0.29%	569	0.37%	566	0.36%
Fiume	71	0.02%	(Note: The Free City of Fiume was absorbed into Italy in 1924.)					
France	5,729	1.60%	3,954	2.40%	3,086	2.01%	3,069	1.94%
Germany	67,607	18.90%	51,227	31.11%	25,957	16.89%	25,814	16.28%
Greece	3,294	0.92%	100	0.06%	307	0.20%	308	0.19%
Hungary	5,638	1.58%	473	0.29%	869	0.57%	865	0.55%
Iceland	75	0.02%	100	0.06%	100	0.07%	100	0.06%
Ireland	(Note: From 1921 to 1924, the quota for the United Kingdom of Great Britain and Ireland encompassed all of Ireland; after 1925, it included only Northern Ireland (which remained part of the UK), with a separate quota created for the Irish Free State.)		28,567	17.35%	17,853	11.61%	17,756	11.20%
Italy	42,057	11.75%	3,854	2.34%	5,802	3.77%	5,666	3.57%
Latvia	1,540	0.43%	142	0.09%	236	0.15%	235	0.15%
Lithuania	2,460	0.69%	344	0.21%	386	0.25%	384	0.24%
Luxembourg	92	0.03%	100	0.06%	100	0.07%	100	0.06%
Netherlands	3,607	1.01%	1,648	1.00%	3,153	2.05%	3,136	1.98%
Norway	12,202	3.41%	6,453	3.92%	2,377	1.55%	2,364	1.49%
Poland	31,146	8.70%	5,982	3.63%	6,524	4.24%	6,488	4.09%
Portugal	2,465	0.69%	503	0.31%	440	0.29%	438	0.28%
Romania	7,419	2.07%	603	0.37%	295	0.19%	289	0.18%
Russia / Soviet Union (Note: U.S.S.R., excluding regions falling under the Asiatic Barred Zone while in effect. Citizens of the Baltic states, whose annexation was not recognized by the United States, and Armenians were subject to separate quotas.)	24,405	6.82%	2,248	1.37%	2,784	1.81%	2,697	1.70%
Spain	912	0.25%	131	0.08%	252	0.16%	250	0.16%
Sweden	20,042	5.60%	9,561	5.81%	3,314	2.16%	3,295	2.08%
Switzerland	3,752	1.05%	2,081	1.26%	1,707	1.11%	1,698	1.07%
Turkey	2,388	0.67%	100	0.06%	226	0.15%	225	0.14%
United Kingdom	77,342	21.62%	34,007	20.65%	65,721	42.76%	65,361	41.22%
Yugoslavia	6,426	1.80%	671	0.41%	845	0.55%	942	0.59%
Australia and New Zealand	359	0.10%	221	0.13%	200	0.13%	700	0.44%
Total from Europe	356,135	99.53%	161,546	98.10%	150,591	97.97%	149,697	94.41%
Total from Asia	1,066	0.30%	1,300	0.79%	1,323	0.86%	3,690	2.33%
Total from Africa	122	0.03%	1,200	0.73%	1,200	0.78%	4,274	2.70%
Total from all countries	357,803	100.00%	164,667	100.00%	153,714	100.00%	158,561	100.00%

==== Preference system ====
The 1952 act created four preference categories for quota admissions: 50% for immigrants with essential skills, 30% for parents of adult citizens, 20% for spouses and children of legal residents, and any leftover green cards for siblings and adult children of citizens.

The 1952 Immigration and Nationality Act removed the contract labor restriction, introducing employment-based preferences for immigrants with economic potential, skills, and education. It established the H-1 visa for temporary nonimmigrants with merit and ability, the H-2 process for approving visas for temporary foreign laborers where local workers were unavailable, and introduced the treaty trader or investor (E) and student (F-1) visas.

The McCarran–Walter Act linked naturalization to the idea of "good moral character" measured by a person's ability to behave morally and honor the Constitution and laws of the United States. The concept of "good moral character" dated back to the Naturalization Act of 1790. The Immigration and Nationality Act of 1952 required applicants to be a person of good moral character who adhered to the principles of the Constitution and was in favorable disposition to the United States. The act gave the government the authority to deem an immigrant who lacks good moral character ineligible for admission or naturalization and deport the immigrant who engaged in a list of activities that violated the "good moral character" requirement such as crimes involving moral turpitude, illegal gambling, alcohol use, drug trafficking, prostitution, unlawful voting, fraud, etc. These violations of the good moral character requirement undermined the U.S. national security.

==== Class of immigrants inadmissible and ineligible for visa ====
Before the Immigration and Nationality Act of 1952, the U.S. Bureau of Immigration vetted newcomers to the United States and often denied entry to new immigrants on subjective conclusion of "perverse" acts such as homosexuality, prostitution, sexual deviance, crime of moral turpitude, economic dependency, or "perverse" bodies like hermaphrodites or individuals with abnormal or small body parts during the period from 1900 to 1924. During this time, immigration authorities denied immigrants entry on this subjective basis by issuing "likely to be a public charge". However, by the 1950s, the immigration authorities solidified this screening measure into law when they enacted a provision against prostitution or any so-called "immoral sexual act". In addition, immigrants deemed feeble-minded, mentally disabled, physically defective, or professional beggars were also ineligible for admission.

The Immigration and Nationality Act of 1952 placed provisions on drinking and substance use as a requirement for admission. The act stated that any immigrant who "is or was ... a habitual drunkard" or "narcotic drug addicts or chronic alcoholics" challenged the notion of good moral character, a requirement for citizenship in the United States. As a result, immigrants who participated in excessive alcohol or substance use were inadmissible to the United States.

According to the Immigration and Nationality Act of 1952, polygamy violated the notion of good moral character under Section 101(f). Any immigrant in a polygamous relationship was inadmissible or ineligible for naturalization as a result. In addition, the polygamy bar denied the polygamous immigrant to immigration benefits such as employment-based visa, asylum, or relief.

Abraham Sofaer, Legal Advisor to Secretary of State George Shultz, in consultation with the White House, pushed for amending the law to end the exclusion of people from the US solely on the ground of their political beliefs. Although facing initial congressional backlash, the law was changed in the State Department's 1988 Authorization legislation.

As Abraham Sofaer described, "The Department of State has long believed that changes are necessary to bring the exclusion and deportation provisions in line with modern reality...It's an anachronism to say that just because someone held some particular political view at some point in his life he should be denied immigration."

==== Class of deportable immigrants ====
The Immigration and Nationality Act eliminated numerous due-process safeguards shielding immigrants from deportation abuses. Senators Hubert Humphrey (D-Minnesota) and Herbert Lehman (D-New York) expressed regret, stating that the act exposed deportees to bureaucratic tyranny and warned that deportations "without review would be the beginning of a police state".

Crimes involving moral turpitude were acts, behaviors, or offenses that violate the standards of a country. The concept, "crimes involving moral turpitude", have been in United States immigration law since the Immigration Act of 1891, which made those who committed crimes involving moral turpitude inadmissible. Despite the difficulty of defining "crimes involving moral turpitude", the Immigration and Nationality Act of 1952 established provisions that help define "crimes involving moral turpitude". Under sections, "Inadmissible aliens" and "Deportable aliens", immigrants were ineligible for naturalization if suspected of or committed criminal convictions, illegal gambling, alcohol use, drug trafficking, prostitution, unlawful voting, etc. within five years of entry. The list of crimes involving moral turpitude lead to removal of the immigrant.

The Immigration and Nationality Act of 1952 deemed immigrants who were anarchists or members of or affiliated with the Communist Party or any other totalitarian organizations that plan to overthrow the United States as deportable immigrants. Immigrants who were successors of any association of Communism, regardless of name changes, still fell under the deportable immigrants. Immigrants who advocated, taught, wrote, published in support for communism, a totalitarian dictatorship, and the overthrowing of the United States were also deportable immigrants.

Under Section 243(h) of the Immigration and Nationality Act of 1952, the Attorney General had the authority to stop the deportation of an immigrant if the Attorney General believed that the immigrant would face physical persecution if he or she returns to the country. The period of withholding deportation was up to the Attorney General as well.

=== Nationality and naturalization ===
==== Nationality ====
===== Citizenship by descent =====
The 1952 act carried over multiple restrictions on citizenship by descent that were introduced into federal law by the Nationality Act of 1940.

These included that, if the other parent was neither a U.S. citizen nor a U.S. national, the U.S. citizen parent needed to meet certain requirements indicating a substantial connection to the United States in order to transmit citizenship to a child born abroad.

Under the 1952 act, and until amendments of November 14, 1986, section 301 thus required that the U.S. citizen parent, "prior to the birth of [the child], was physically present in the United States or its outlying possessions for a period or periods totaling not less than ten years, at least five of which were after attaining the age of fourteen years : Provided, That any periods of honorable service in the Armed Forces of the United States by such citizen parent may be included in computing the physical presence requirements of this paragraph."

In addition, if the U.S. citizen parent was a man who was not married to the alien mother, section 309 required that "the paternity of such child [be] established while such child is under the age of twenty-one years by legitimation."

==== Naturalization ====
A 1962 guideline explained procedures under the Act:

The Immigration and Nationality Act of 1952 requires an alien to apply for a petition for naturalization. This form may be obtained from any office of the Immigration and Naturalization Service, a division of the Department of Justice, or from any court authorized to naturalize aliens.

Before applying, an alien must be at least 18 years old and must have been lawfully admitted to live permanently in the United States. He must have lived in the United States for five years and for the last six months in the state where he seeks to be naturalized. He must be of good moral character and "attached to the principles of the Constitution". The law states that an alien is not of good moral character if he is a drunkard, has committed adultery, has more than one wife, makes his living by gambling, has lied to the Immigration and Naturalization Service, has been in jail more than 180 days for any reason during his five years in the United States, or is a convicted murderer.

== Enforcement ==
The following list provides examples of those who were excluded from the Act prior to the 1990 amendment. While it has not been substantiated that all of these individuals formally petitioned to become United States citizens, many were banned from traveling to the US because of anti-American political views and/or criminal records. Among those listed, there are noted communists, socialists, and anti-American sympathizers.

- Kōbō Abe, Japanese writer
- Tom Bottomore, British sociologist
- Dennis Brutus, South African writer
- Boris Christoff, Bulgarian opera singer
- Julio Cortázar, Argentine novelist
- Mahmoud Darwish, Palestinian poet
- Michel Foucault, French philosopher
- Dario Fo, Italian playwright and recipient of the 1997 Nobel Prize in Literature
- Carlos Fuentes, Mexican writer
- Gabriel García Márquez, Colombian novelist and recipient of the 1982 Nobel Prize in Literature
- Graham Greene, British writer
- Doris Lessing, writer and recipient of the 2007 Nobel Prize in Literature (Southern Rhodesia (now Zimbabwe) / Great Britain)
- Ernest Mandel, scholar and Trotskyist activist
- Farley Mowat, Canadian writer
- Jan Myrdal, Swedish scholar
- Pablo Neruda, Chilean poet and recipient of the 1971 Nobel Prize in Literature
- Carl Paivio, Finnish labor activist and anarchist
- Angel Rama, Uruguayan scholar
- Margaret Randall, writer, translator, and activist
- Pierre Trudeau, prior to becoming Prime Minister of Canada.

== Modifications ==
Parts of the Act remain in place today, but it has been amended many times and was modified substantially by the Immigration and Nationality Services Act of 1965. The 1952 Act was amended by the 1965 act to include a significant provision stating:

No person shall receive any preference or priority or be discriminated against in the issuance of an immigrant visa because of the person's race, sex, nationality, place of birth, or place of residence.

When regulations issued under the authority of the Passport Act of 1926 were challenged in Haig v. Agee, Congress enacted § 707(b) of the Foreign Relations Authorization Act, Fiscal Year 1979 (Pub. L. 95–426, 92 Stat. 993, enacted October 7, 1978), amending § 215 of the Immigration and Nationality Act making it unlawful to travel abroad without a passport. Until that legislation, under the Travel Control Act of 1918, the president had the authority to require passports for foreign travel only in time of war.

Some provisions that excluded certain classes of immigrants based on their political beliefs were revoked by the Immigration Act of 1990; however, members of Communist Parties are still banned from becoming citizens of the United States.

After the September 11, 2001 attacks, President George W. Bush implemented the National Security Entry-Exit Registration System and other border and immigration controls.

The REAL ID Act of 2005 amended the INA to expand terrorism-related grounds for deportation. Specifically, it revised INA § 237(a)(4)(B), also known as 8 U.S.C. § 1227(a)(4)(B) to align deportability criteria with the broader inadmissibility provisions already established under INA § 212(a)(3)(B). Prior to the amendment, an alien legally present in the United States could only be deported for directly engaging in terrorist activity. The REAL ID Act broadened this scope to include membership in a terrorist organization, endorsement of terrorist activity, and provision of material support to terrorism—grounds that had previously applied only to exclude individuals from entering the country.

Executive Order 13769, superseding Executive Order 13780 and Presidential Proclamation 9645, all of which were issued in 2017 under the authority of the Immigration and Nationality Acts and sought to impose a blanket restriction on entry into the United States of people from several nations, were challenged in court and parts were initially subject to various restraining orders. On June 26, 2018, the U.S. Supreme Court upheld the president's authority to implement these restrictions in the case of Trump v. Hawaii.

== See also ==
- Bracero Program
- History of immigration to the United States
- History of laws concerning immigration and naturalization in the United States
- Immigration Act of 1924
- Immigration and Nationality Act of 1965
- List of United States immigration laws
- McCarthyism and antisemitism
- National Origins Formula
- Remain in Mexico
