= Title 8 of the United States Code =

U.S. federal statutes on nationality

Title 8 of the United States Code is a non-positive law title of the United States Code with the heading "Aliens and Nationality." The Immigration and Nationality Act of 1952 is principally editorially codified to chapter 12 of Title 8. The heading of the title was originally "Aliens and Citizenship" (1926) but it was changed to its current heading, "Aliens and Nationality," starting with the 1940 edition of the U.S. Code.

== Chapters 1–11 ==
- Chapter 1: General Provisions (repealed or omitted)
- Chapter 2: Elective Franchise (transferred)
- Chapter 3: Civil Rights (transferred/repealed)
- Chapter 4: Freedmen (omitted)
- Chapter 5: Alien Ownership of Land (transferred/omitted)
- Chapter 6: Immigration (transferred/omitted/repealed)
- Chapter 7: Exclusion of Chinese (omitted/repealed)
- Chapter 8: The Cooly Trade (repealed)
- Chapter 9: Miscellaneous Provisions (repealed or transferred)
- Chapter 10: Alien Registration (repealed)
- Chapter 11: Nationality (repealed or transferred)

== Chapter 12: Immigration and Nationality ==
=== Subchapter I: General Provisions ===
Section 1101: Definitions
Section 1102: Diplomatic and semidiplomatic immunities
Section 1103: Powers and duties of the Secretary, the Under Secretary, and the Attorney General
Section 1104: Powers and duties of Secretary of State
Section 1105: Liaison with internal security officers; data exchange
Section 1105a: Employment authorization for battered spouses of certain nonimmigrants
Section 1106 is repealed.
Section 1107: Additional report

=== Subchapter II: Immigration ===
==== Part I: Selection System ====
Section 1151: Worldwide level of immigration
Section 1151a is repealed
Section 1152: Numerical limitations on individual foreign states
Section 1153: Allocation of immigrant visas
Section 1154: Procedure for granting immigrant status
Section 1155: Revocation of approval of petitions; effective date
Section 1156: Unused immigrant visas
Section 1157: Annual admission of refugees and admission of emergency situation refugees
Section 1158: Asylum
Section 1159: Adjustment of status of refugees
Section 1160: Special agricultural workers
Section 1161 is repealed.

==== Part II: Admission Qualifications for Aliens; Travel Control of Citizens and Aliens ====
Section 1181: Admission of immigrants into the United States
Section 1182: Inadmissible aliens
Section 1182a is repealed.
Section 1182d: Denial of visas to confiscators of American property
Section 1182e: Denial of entry into United States of foreign nationals engaged in establishment or enforcement of forced abortion or sterilization policy
Section 1182f: Denial of entry into United States of Chinese and other nationals engaged in coerced organ or bodily tissue transplantation
Section 1183: Admission of aliens on giving bond or undertaking; return upon permanent departure
Section 1183a: Requirements for sponsor's affidavit of support
Section 1184: Admission of nonimmigrants
Section 1184a: Philippine Traders as nonimmigrants
Section 1185: Travel control of citizens and aliens
Section 1186 is transferred.
Section 1186a: Conditional permanent resident status for certain alien spouses and sons and daughters
Section 1186b: Conditional permanent resident status for certain alien entrepreneurs, spouses, and children
Section 1187: Visa waiver program for certain visitors
Section 1187a: Provision of assistance to non-program countries
Section 1188: Admission of temporary H–2A workers
Section 1189: Designation of foreign terrorist organizations

==== Part III: Issuance of Entry Documents ====
Section 1201: Issuance of visas
Section 1201a is repealed.
Section 1202: Application for visas
Section 1203: Reentry permit
Section 1204: Immediate relative and special immigrant visas
Section 1205 is repealed.

==== Part IV: Inspection, Apprehension, Examination, Exclusion, and Removal ====
Section 1221: Lists of alien and citizen passengers arriving and departing
Section 1222: Detention of aliens for physical and mental examination
Section 1223: Entry through or from foreign territory and adjacent islands
Section 1224: Designation of ports of entry for aliens arriving by aircraft
Section 1225: Inspection by immigration officers; expedited removal of inadmissible arriving aliens; referral for hearing
Section 1225a: Preinspection at foreign airports
Section 1226: Apprehension and detention of aliens
Section 1226a: Mandatory detention of suspected terrorists; habeas corpus; judicial review
Section 1227: Deportable aliens
Section 1228: Expedited removal of aliens convicted of committing aggravated felonies
Section 1229: Initiation of removal proceedings
Section 1229a: Removal proceedings
Section 1229b: Cancellation of removal; adjustment of status
Section 1229c: Voluntary departure
Section 1230: Records of admission
Section 1231: Detention and removal of aliens ordered removed
Section 1232: Enhancing efforts to combat the trafficking of children

==== Part V: Adjustment and Change of Status ====
Section 1251 is transferred.
Section 1251a is repealed.
Section 1252: Judicial review of orders of removal
Section 1252a is transferred.
Section 1252b is repealed.
Section 1252c: Authorizing State and local law enforcement officials to arrest and detain certain illegal aliens
Section 1253: Penalties related to removal
Section 1254 is repealed.
Section 1254a: Temporary protected status
Section 1254b: Collection of fees under temporary protected status program
Section 1255: Adjustment of status of nonimmigrant to that of person admitted for permanent residence
Section 1255a: Adjustment of status of certain entrants before January 1, 1982, to that of person admitted for lawful residence
Section 1255b: Adjustment of status of certain nonimmigrants to that of persons admitted for permanent residence
Section 1256: Rescission of adjustment of status; effect upon naturalized citizen
Section 1257: Adjustment of status of certain resident aliens to nonimmigrant status; exceptions
Section 1258: Change of nonimmigrant classification
Section 1259: Record of admission for permanent residence in the case of certain aliens who entered the United States prior to January 1, 1972
Section 1260: Removal of aliens falling into distress

==== Part VI: Special Provisions Relating to Alien Crewmen ====
Section 1281: Alien crewmen
Section 1282: Conditional permits to land temporarily
Section 1283: Hospital treatment of alien crewmen afflicted with certain diseases
Section 1284: Control of alien crewmen
Section 1285: Employment on passenger vessels of aliens afflicted with certain disabilities
Section 1286: Discharge of alien crewmen; penalties
Section 1287: Alien crewmen brought into the United States with intent to evade immigration laws; penalties
Section 1288: Limitations on performance of longshore work by alien crewmen

==== Part VII: Registration of Aliens ====
Section 1301: Alien seeking entry; contents
Section 1302: Registration of aliens
Section 1303: Registration of special groups
Section 1304: Forms for registration and fingerprinting
Section 1305: Notices of change of address
Section 1306: Penalties

==== Part VIII: General Penalty Provisions ====
Section 1321: Prevention of unauthorized landing of aliens
Section 1322: Bringing in aliens subject to denial of admission on a health-related ground; persons liable; clearance papers; exceptions; "person" defined
Section 1323: Unlawful bringing of aliens into United States
Section 1324: Bringing in and harboring certain aliens
Section 1324a: Unlawful employment of aliens
Section 1324b: Unfair immigration-related employment practices
Section 1324c: Penalties for document fraud
Section 1324d: Civil penalties for failure to depart
Section 1325: Improper entry by alien
Section 1326: Reentry of removed aliens
Section 1327: Aiding or assisting certain aliens to enter
Section 1328: Importation of alien for immoral purpose
Section 1329: Jurisdiction of district courts
Section 1330: Collection of penalties and expenses

==== Part IX: Miscellaneous ====
Section 1351: Nonimmigrant visa fees
Section 1352: Printing of reentry permits and blank forms of manifest and crew lists; sale to public
Section 1353: Travel expenses and expense of transporting remains of officers and employees dying outside of United States
Section 1353a: Officers and employees; overtime services; extra compensation; length of working day
Section 1353b: Extra compensation; payment
Section 1353c: Immigration officials; service in foreign contiguous territory
Section 1353d: Disposition of money received as extra compensation
Section 1354: Applicability to members of the Armed Forces
Section 1355: Disposal of privileges at immigrant stations; rentals; retail sale; disposition of receipts
Section 1356: Disposition of moneys collected under the provisions of this subchapter
Section 1357: Powers of immigration officers and employees
Section 1358: Local jurisdiction over immigrant stations
Section 1359: Application to American Indians born in Canada
Section 1360: Establishment of central file; information from other departments and agencies
Section 1361: Burden of proof upon alien
Section 1362: Right to counsel
Section 1363: Deposit of and interest on cash received to secure immigration bonds
Section 1363a: Undercover investigation authority
Section 1363b is repealed.
Section 1364: Triennial comprehensive report on immigration
Section 1365: Reimbursement of States for costs of incarcerating illegal aliens and certain Cuban nationals
Section 1365a: Integrated entry and exit data system
Section 1365b: Biometric entry and exit data system
Section 1366: Annual report on criminal aliens
Section 1367: Penalties for disclosure of information
Section 1368: Increase in INS detention facilities; report on detention space
Section 1369: Treatment of expenses subject to emergency medical services exception
Section 1370: Reimbursement of States and localities for emergency ambulance services
Section 1371: Reports
Section 1372: Program to collect information relating to nonimmigrant foreign students and other exchange program participants
Section 1373: Communication between government agencies and the Immigration and Naturalization Service
Section 1374: Information regarding female genital mutilation
Section 1375 is repealed.
Section 1375a: Domestic violence information and resources for immigrants and regulation of international marriage brokers
Section 1375b: Protections for domestic workers and other nonimmigrants
Section 1375c: Protections, remedies, and limitations on issuance for A–3 and G–5 visas
Section 1376: Data on nonimmigrant overstay rates
Section 1377: Collection of data on detained asylum seekers
Section 1378: Collection of data on other detained aliens
Section 1379: Technology standard to confirm identity
Section 1380: Maintenance of statistics by the Department of Homeland Security
Section 1381: Secretary of Labor report
Section 1382: Acceptance and administration of gifts for immigration integration grants program

== Chapters 13–15 ==
- Chapter 13: Immigration and Naturalization Service
- Chapter 14: Restricting Welfare and Public Benefits for Aliens
- Chapter 15: Enhanced Border Security and Visa Entry Reform
