= Nationwide injunction =

United States federal court injunction

In United States law, a nationwide injunction (also called a universal injunction or national injunction) is injunctive relief in which a court binds the federal government even in its relations with nonparties. In their prototypical form, nationwide injunctions are used to restrict the federal government from enforcing a statute or regulation.

Nationwide injunctions have come into prominent use and controversy during the Obama and Trump administrations, when they have been used by federal judges to enjoin the enforcement of significant policies, including the implementation of the Deferred Action for Parents of Americans policy and the rescission of the Deferred Action for Childhood Arrivals policy.

On June 27, 2025, the Supreme Court limited, but did not eliminate, a court's ability to issue nationwide injunctions in the case, Trump v. CASA, Inc.

== History before the American founding ==
Professor Samuel Bray has said early equity practice included "nothing remotely like a national injunction", while a group of prominent legal historians more narrowly concluded that "no modern-style nationwide injunctions issued". Courts did have the equitable power to enjoin defendants with regard to the plaintiff, but typically not the world at large. In cases where multiple parties had a common claim against the same defendant, the British chancellor sometimes offered a remedy known as a "bill of peace." The bill of peace bound the defendant against that group of parties with a common claim, regardless of whether they were all parties in the case. For example, if several tenants brought a claim against a landlord that they shared in common with all tenants, then the court of equity might issue a remedy that applied to the landlord's relations with those tenants not before the court. This order only applied to the defendant's interactions with an identified group of similarly situated nonparties, rather than the entire world, and it depended on the group being small enough and enough actual claims being brought by members of the group.

== History in the United States federal courts ==
=== First 175 years ===
For the first 175 years of the republic, courts typically did not enjoin defendants with respect to nonparties, especially if that defendant was the federal government. Some scholars have estimated that American federal courts issued a dozen nationwide injunctions during this time, while others have estimated that American federal courts issued zero nationwide injunctions during this time.

In the nineteenth century, courts occasionally enjoined a municipality or county from enforcing a challenged tax or ordinance against nonparties. This was considered an extension of the "bill of peace" because it resolved a common claim by a small and cohesive group. The Supreme Court in Frothingham v. Mellon (1923) said this type of suit was justified by the theory that citizens of a county or municipality have a relationship comparable to that of shareholders to a corporation.

One explanation for the lack of nationwide injunctions is that the federal government itself waived its sovereign immunity from suit in 1976, while another is that venue and personal jurisdiction rules for a long time restricted litigants from suing cabinet officers outside of Washington, D.C., when seeking injunctions.

Some cases from this period raised questions about the lawfulness of nationwide injunctions or closely related remedies.

- Scott v. Donald (1897) — James Donald sued the state of South Carolina for confiscating his alcohol under a statute he argued violated the federal Constitution. In addition to damages, Donald asked the court to enjoin the state from enforcing the statute against anyone. Despite agreeing that the statute was unconstitutional, the Supreme Court held that "we are unable to wholly approve the decree entered in this case." The Court explained that "there may be others in like case with the plaintiff, and that such persons may be numerous, but such a state of facts is too conjectural to furnish a safe basis upon which a court of equity ought to grant an injunction."
- Lewis Publishing Co. v. Morgan (1913) — In 1913, the Supreme Court temporarily granted an order "restraining the defendants . . . from enforcing or attempting to enforce the provisions of said statute, and particularly restraining them from denying to appellant and other newspaper publishers the privileges of the mail. . . ." Professor Mila Sohoni interpreted the Lewis Publishing order as an "injunction barring the enforcement of the new federal law against anyone until the merits had been decided." Professor Samuel Bray interpreted it as a matter of estoppel because the government had already promised to the court it would not enforce the provision against anyone during litigation.
- Frothingham v. Mellon (1923) — Harriet Frothingham sued the federal government for spending money under the Maternity Act, which she argued exceeded the powers of the federal government. She asked the Supreme Court to enjoin the government from carrying out the provisions of this act with regard to her and nonparties alike. The Supreme Court held against her unanimously, reasoning that a Court could not provide such relief without "assum[ing] a position of authority over the governmental acts of another and co-equal department, an authority which plainly we do not possess."

=== New Deal challenges ===
After the federal courts held numerous acts of New Deal legislation unconstitutional, they did not issue nationwide injunctions. Sometimes over a thousand individual injunctions were granted with regard to a single provision, as each plaintiff brought suit to ensure that the statute could not apply to them.

=== Late 20th century ===
Justice Clarence Thomas has written that nationwide injunctions "emerg[ed] for the first time in the 1960s and dramatically increas[ed] in popularity only very recently." Professor Samuel Bray traces "[t]he [e]mergence of [n]ational [i]njunctions" to the 1960s.

The practice may have begun in 1963, when a panel for the Court of Appeals for the District of Columbia Circuit conditionally enjoined the Secretary of Transportation from applying his challenged wage regulation to any parties, not merely the plaintiffs.

According to the Department of Justice, nationwide injunctions remained "exceedingly rare" for a few decades after 1963. However, in 1968, the Supreme Court in Flast v. Cohen noted in dicta and without condemnation that "injunctive relief sought by appellants . . . extends to any program that would have the unconstitutional features alleged in the complaint," rather than merely to those programs injuring the plaintiff. And in 1973, a district judge in New York granted a preliminary injunction against the Interstate Commerce Commission that would "affect the agency in the entire scope of its authority and jurisdiction."

Courts issued an average of 1.5 nationwide injunctions per year against the Reagan, Clinton, and George W. Bush administrations. In 1987, the Ninth Circuit, upheld an injunction against the Secretary of Labor to enforce the Migrant and Seasonal Agricultural Worker Protection Act within the entire forestry industry, reasoning that "the district court has the power to order nationwide relief where it is required." In 1998, the District of Columbia Circuit upheld a nationwide injunction against the Army Corps of Engineers, preventing it from enforcing against anyone a rule it had promulgated under the Clean Water Act. It held that after finding an agency rule or regulation unconstitutional under the Administrative Procedure Act, a federal court should ordinarily "vacate" the rule or regulation rather than merely hold it unlawful with respect to the plaintiffs.

According to the Department of Justice, federal courts issued 12 nationwide injunctions against the George W. Bush administration. Among the examples were a 2002 holding of Judge Charles B. Kornmann enjoining the Department of Agriculture from enforcing a rule promulgated under the Beef Promotion and Research Act and a 2004 holding of Judge Reggie Walton enjoining the federal government from enforcing a policy it established under the Endangered Species Act. Judge Walton reasoned that a nationwide injunction was appropriate "because the declaratory judgment alone is inadequate when a policy is found to be facially invalid."

=== Obama administration ===
According to the Department of Justice, federal courts issued 19 or 20 nationwide injunctions against the Obama administration, including many on high-profile legal and political issues. The Fifth Circuit upheld a nationwide injunction initially issued by Judge Andrew Hanen of the Southern District of Texas against the federal government's implementation of DAPA in United States v. Texas. Judge Reed O'Connor of the Northern District of Texas issued a nationwide injunction to prevent the Obama administration from issuing its guidance that Title IX required institutions to allocate bathroom accessibility based on gender identity rather than biological sex. When the Department of Justice requested that Judge O'Connor narrow relief to the plaintiff states, he declined to do so. Judge Sam R. Cummings of the Northern District of Texas issued a nationwide injunction to prevent the Obama Administration from issuing a rule that would require employers to disclose certain activities with third parties related to dissuading labor unions. And Judge Virginia A. Phillips of the Central District of California held in 2010 that the federal government's "Don't Ask, Don't Tell" policy was unconstitutional and permanently enjoined the Secretary of Defense from enforcing it.

=== First Trump administration ===
According to the Department of Justice, federal courts issued 20 nationwide injunctions against the first Trump Administration in its first year alone, and as of early 2020 had issued 55 such injunctions. Within three weeks of President Trump's inauguration, Judge James L. Robart of the Western District of Washington issued a nationwide injunction to prevent the administration from implementing its executive order restricting entry into the United States. The following month, Judge Derrick K. Watson of the District of Hawaii issued a nationwide injunction to prevent the administration from implementing an executive order amending its entry restrictions. In April 2017, Judge William Orrick of the Northern District of California issued a nationwide injunction to prevent the administration from restricting funding to "sanctuary cities." Judge Orrick reasoned that "where a law is unconstitutional on its face, and not simply in its application to certain plaintiffs, a nationwide injunction is appropriate." In December 2017, Judge Marsha J. Pechman issued a nationwide injunction to prevent the administration from enforcing its transgender military ban.

In early 2019, Judge Richard Seeborg of the Northern District of California issued a nationwide injunction preventing the Department of Commerce from asking census takers if they are United States citizens. In December 2019, Judge David Briones of the Western District of Texas issued a nationwide injunction to prevent the administration from using certain funds to erect a border wall. Also in 2019, Judge Jon S. Tigar of the Northern District of California issued a nationwide injunction to prevent the Department of Justice and Department of Homeland Security from implementing a rule regulating asylum eligibility. And multiple judges issued nationwide injunctions to prevent the Department of Homeland Security from rescinding the Deferred Action for Childhood Arrivals program, and the Ninth Circuit affirmed one such injunction.

=== Biden administration ===
Fourteen national injunctions occurred in the first three years of Biden's term.

=== Second Trump administration ===
As of April 2025, federal judges have issued three federal injunctions against the Trump administration's efforts to rollback protections of the 14th amendment to the United States constitution. Courts have issued at least 14 other nationwide injunctions against the second Trump administration.

On June 27, 2025, the United States Supreme Court ruled in Trump v. CASA, Inc. that federal courts do not have the authority to issue universal injunctions, on the basis that "Congress has granted federal courts no such power" and that nationwide injunctions were not practiced when the Judiciary Act of 1789 created federal courts' jurisdiction over suits in equity.

== Controversy surrounding lawfulness ==
=== Justices and judges ===
The Supreme Court has not decided whether nationwide injunctions are lawful, but some justices have criticized the practice. In Trump v. Hawaii (2018), Justice Clarence Thomas wrote a concurrence to say that he was "skeptical that district courts have the authority to enter universal injunctions." Citing the long history of common law practice as well as the lack of statutory or constitutional authority, he concluded that "[n]o persuasive defense has yet been offered for the practice." In a decision on a stay application in Department of Homeland Security v. New York (2020), Justice Neil Gorsuch wrote a concurrence criticizing the lawfulness and practical consequences of injunctions that "direct how the defendant must act toward persons who are not parties to the case." Such injunctions, he explained, "raise serious questions about the scope of courts' equitable powers under Article III" because a court only has jurisdiction to "redress the injuries sustained by a particular plaintiff in a particular lawsuit."

Judges defending their nationwide injunctions have cited the broad equitable authority of courts and the possibility of harm to nonparties. A Ninth Circuit panel has explained that a broad injunction may be necessary to fully vindicate the rights of the parties themselves and, in the immigration context, that a nationwide injunction is mandated by the language of the Naturalization Clause. Another Ninth Circuit panel has said that the Administrative Procedure Act mandates nationwide injunctions. A Fifth Circuit panel has held that nationwide injunctions are appropriate because district courts exercise "the judicial power" of the entire United States, not just a smaller territory, and because in certain contexts—like immigration—uniformity is required. On the other hand, Judge Nicholas Garaufis of the Eastern District of New York has expressed concerns about the constraining effect of nationwide injunctions on future litigation, where another court might be inclined to rule the other way on the merits but cannot do so because that would conflict with the injunction issued by a sister court.

=== Scholarship ===
Professor Samuel Bray is a leading critic of nationwide injunctions. Tracing equity practices at common law, Bray has argued that a federal court may only give an injunction that "protects the plaintiff vis-à-vis the defendant, wherever the plaintiff and the defendant may both happen to be." It cannot "constrain the defendant's conduct vis-à-vis nonparties." That is because, he argues, a federal court "has no constitutional basis to decide disputes and issue remedies for those who are not parties." Bray has noted that, among other problems, the current practice could lead to "conflicting injunctions," a situation where multiple parties bring suit, one court orders a defendant not to apply a statute or regulation against anyone, and another court orders the same defendant to ignore the first injunction or to continue to implement the statute or regulation. Professor Michael Morley has written several articles on nationwide injunctions. He has argued that nationwide injunctions through a national "class action" are "presumptively inappropriate," but may be lawful when the plaintiffs are asserting clearly established rights, the plaintiffs' rights are indivisible, the plaintiffs' claims are based on the burdens of the unconstitutionality of the challenged provisions, and it would be inappropriate to issue a narrower injunction.

Professor Mila Sohoni has argued that nationwide injunctions are both constitutional and good. She argues that nationwide injunctions were recognized as a valid remedial power of federal courts for almost all of the twentieth century, and perhaps even earlier. Similarly, attorneys David Hausman & Spencer E. Amdur have defended nationwide injunctions because they can prevent widespread harm, such as deportations of hundreds of thousands of people. Hausman and Amdur advocate such injunctions "when necessary to prevent real-world injuries," under a framework that "would otherwise preserve opportunities for percolation across multiple chancellors." Professor Alan Trammell has argued that preclusion principles justify nationwide injunctions specifically in cases "when the government acts in bad faith, including most notably when government officials fail to abide by settled law."

=== Executive branch ===
The executive branch has often criticized the practice of nationwide injunctions. On March 10, 2018, Attorney General Jeff Sessions authored an op-ed in National Review calling nationwide injunctions "a threat to our constitutional order." "Nationwide injunctions," Sessions wrote, "mean that each of the more than 600 federal district judges in the United States can freeze a law or regulation throughout the country—regardless of whether the other 599 disagree."

On September 13, 2018, Attorney General Sessions issued a memorandum to the Department of Justice on "Litigation Guidelines for Cases Presenting the Possibility of Nationwide Injunctions." Consistent with "the Department's considered and longstanding" opposition to nationwide injunctions, Attorney General Sessions instructed litigators to argue before courts that nationwide injunctions

(1) exceed the constitutional limitations on judicial power; (2) deviate from longstanding historical exercise of equitable power; (3) impede reasoned discussion of legal issues among the lower courts; (4) undermine legal rules meant to ensure orderly resolution of disputed issues; (5) interfere with judgments proper to the other branches of government; and (6) undermine public confidence in the judiciary.

On February 4, 2019, Assistant Attorney General Beth Williams reiterated the Department of Justice's opposition to "injunctions that grant relief to parties outside the case, and outside of the class action framework, when such relief is not necessary to redress the plaintiff's injuries." She remarked that "the rash of nationwide injunctions strikes at the heart of our democratic system" because a nationwide injunction "seriously impedes decision-making in the federal courts by interfering with percolation of a contested legal issue," "invites unvarnished 'judge-shopping,' undermining faith in our judiciary," and "allows unelected district court judges to issue wholesale vetoes on the domestic policy and national security decisions of our elected officials."

On September 5, 2019, Attorney General William Barr authored an op-ed in the Wall Street Journal entitled 'End Nationwide Injunctions.' He criticized the effect of nationwide injunctions on legislative and judicial deliberations, and on the limited power Article III grants to judges—especially the solo district court judges who typically issue these injunctions.

=== Congress ===
On November 30, 2017, the House Committee on the Judiciary Subcommittee on Courts, Intellectual Property, and the Internet held a hearing on "The Role and Impact of Nationwide Injunctions by District Courts." At the hearing, Samuel Bray, Hans von Spakovsky, Amanda Frost and Michael Morley discussed the legal issues surrounding the practice.

On September 7, 2018, Representative Bob Goodlatte introduced the "Injunctive Authority Clarification Act of 2018." The Act did not make it to a vote, but it would have amended the United States Code to provide that:

No court of the United States (and no district court of the Virgin Islands, Guam, or the Northern Mariana Islands) shall issue an order that purports to restrain the enforcement against a non-party of any statute, regulation, order, or similar authority, unless the non-party is represented by a party acting in a representative capacity pursuant to the Federal Rules of Civil Procedure.

In September, 2019, Senator Tom Cotton and Representative Mark Meadows introduced the "Nationwide Injunction Abuse Prevention Act of 2019." The Act would amend the United States Code to provide that "no district court may issue any order providing injunctive relief unless the order is applicable only to (1) the parties to the case before the district court; or (2) the judicial district in which the order is issued."

On February 25, 2020, the Senate Committee on the Judiciary held a hearing on "Rule By District Judge: The Challenges of Universal Injunctions," considering an array of perspectives on the rise of the nationwide injunctions and the possible policy solutions. Committee Chairman Senator Lindsey Graham noted his concern that "I don't think you can run a country this way" and Senator Dianne Feinstein expressed her interest in learning more about the practice, as she "was not really familiar with what a nationwide injunction is," but noted that nationwide injunctions helped protect hundreds of thousands of DACA recipients from deportation.

=== States ===
After District Judge Andrew Hanen enjoined the Obama Administration from enforcing DAPA, a number of nonparty states submitted an amicus brief asserting that they did not want to be "protected" with the relief that was extended to them. "[I]in light of the complete absence of even a claim of harm in the nonplaintiff States," they wrote, "there is no basis for forcing the injunction on us."

=== Other coverage ===
The legality of nationwide injunctions has been publicly debated at conferences of lawyers and academics, including at the 2018 American Bar Association's Appellate Judges Education Institute (AJEI) Summit and at the 2019 Federalist Society Western Chapters Conference, as well as in the National Constitution Center's "We The People" podcast.

Various media outlets have criticized the practice. In 2015, the Daily Kos published an article on "How conservative federal judges in Texas are putting a stranglehold on President Obama's policies." The article explained:

An unsettling pattern has emerged in Texas of federal district judges issuing nationwide injunctions on policies put forward by the Obama administration. In other words, judges from the most conservative circuit in the nation are overriding the federal government and dictating policy nationwide from their benches in Texas.

Four years later, the Heritage Foundation published an article entitled "Time to End the Tyranny of District Court Judges' Nationwide Injunctions." It argued that the nationwide injunction has "become increasingly common over the past few decades as political activists try to enlist judges to make the kind of widespread policy changes that the legislative or executive branches are designed to handle."

== Terminology ==
The legal world has yet to come to a consensus about what to call these injunctions. In his Trump v. Hawaii concurrence, Justice Thomas noted that "[i]njunctions that prohibit the Executive Branch from applying a law or policy against anyone" have been called both "nationwide" and "universal" injunctions, but chose to use the latter term "because it is more precise." He reasoned that such injunctions "are distinctive because they prohibit the Government from enforcing a policy with respect to anyone, including nonparties—not because they have wide geographic breadth."Justice Gorsuch, in his Department of Homeland Security v. New York concurrence, noted that injunctions that "direct how the defendant must act toward persons who are not parties to the case" could be called "nationwide," "universal," or even "cosmic" injunctions.

Professor Bray has written that "'Nationwide injunction' is especially inapt, because it emphasizes territorial breadth, when the real point of distinction is that the injunction protects nonparties." He chose the term "National Injunctions" because it conveyed the "distinctive fact that these injunctions constrain the national government, as opposed to state governments." Getzel Berger has similarly written that "[t]he term 'nationwide injunction' is somewhat of a misnomer" because "what makes nationwide injunctions controversial is not just that they apply everywhere in the country but that they regulate the defendant's conduct as to everyone in the country—even if they were not party to the suit." Jesse Panuccio has argued these injunctions should be called "non-party injunctions."
