= Immigration policy of the United States =

In the United States, federal policy oversees and regulates immigration and citizenship. The United States Congress has authority over immigration policy, and delegates enforcement to the Department of Homeland Security. Historically, the United States went through a period of loose immigration policy in the early-19th century followed by a period of strict immigration policy in the late-19th and early-20th centuries. Policy areas related to the immigration process include visa policy, asylum policy, and naturalization policy. Policy areas related to illegal immigration include deferral policy and removal policy.

== Policy development ==
Article One of the United States Constitution directly empowers Congress to establish laws regarding naturalization. Supreme Court rulings such as Chae Chan Ping v. United States in 1889 and Fong Yue Ting v. United States in 1893 hold that the powers of Congress over foreign policy extend to legislation regarding immigration. The Fourteenth Amendment to the Constitution grants birthright citizenship through the Citizenship Clause. Historically, immigration to the United States has been regulated through a series of Naturalization Acts and Immigration Acts.

Since 2003, the Department of Homeland Security has been responsible for carrying out immigration policy in the United States, and the department has three agencies that oversee immigration. Customs and Border Protection is responsible for border control. The Immigration and Customs Enforcement is responsible for law enforcement around national borders and enforcement of laws against illegal immigration. The Citizenship and Immigration Services are responsible for processing legal immigration and naturalization. Other agencies involved in immigration policy include the Executive Office for Immigration Review in the Department of Justice and the Office of Refugee Resettlement in the Department of Health and Human Services.

== History ==
=== 18th century ===
The United States did not heavily legislate on immigration during the 18th and 19th centuries, resulting in a policy of open borders. Citizenship was restricted on the basis of race. Immigration and naturalization were typically legislated separately at this time, with no coordination between policy on the two issues. The Naturalization Act of 1790 was the first federal law to govern the naturalization process in the United States; restricting naturalization to white immigrants. Several additional Naturalization Acts modified the terms of naturalization in the 1790s and 1800s.

=== 19th century ===
To protect the rights of recently freed slaves, the Civil Rights Act of 1866 guaranteed that all individuals born within the United States were automatically granted citizenship. This right was written into the Constitution under the Citizenship Clause with the ratification of the Fourteenth Amendment in 1868. The naturalization process was expanded to include African Americans with the Naturalization Act of 1870, but immigration from China was explicitly banned under the Chinese Exclusion Act of 1882. As people from more countries immigrated to the United States, courts were tasked with determining the racial origin of prospective citizens to determine eligibility. In 1898, the Supreme Court ruled in United States v. Wong Kim Ark that birthright citizenship applied to the children of Chinese immigrants.

=== 20th century ===
The Naturalization Act of 1906 created the Bureau of Immigration and Naturalization to organize immigration policy. Immigration to the United States from Japan ended in 1907 following an informal agreement between the two countries, and immigration restrictions on East Asian countries were expanded through the Immigration Act of 1917 and the Immigration Act of 1924. Immigration from China would not be restored until the Magnuson Act was passed in 1943.

The Emergency Quota Act of 1921 established the first quota system to restrict the number of immigrants from a given country. The Immigration and Naturalization Service was created in 1933 by combining the Bureau of Immigration and the Bureau of Naturalization. The Nationality Act of 1940 was passed to create a unified code of United States naturalization law. Following World War II, the War Brides Act allowed exemptions of immigration quotas for immediate relatives of American service-members. The Luce–Celler Act of 1946 made immigrants from India and the Philippines eligible for citizenship, although it capped entry at 100 immigrants per country per year. The Immigration and Nationality Act of 1952 was passed to create a unified code of United States immigration law, and the Immigration and Nationality Act of 1965 repealed the quota system that was used to limit immigration from each country.

The Vietnam War resulted in a significant increase of immigrants and refugees to the United States from Southeast Asia. The Refugee Act was passed in 1980 to establish a legal framework for accepting refugees, and the American Homecoming Act gave preferential status to immigrant children of American service-members. The Immigration Reform and Control Act of 1986 provided a path to permanent residency to some illegal immigrants but made it illegal for employers to hire illegal immigrants. Immigration was significantly reformed by the Immigration Act of 1990, which set a cap of 700,000 immigrants annually and changed the standards for immigration. The IIRIRA was passed in 1996 to apply restrictions on illegal immigrants.

=== 21st century ===
In 2001, the Supreme Court ruled that immigrants cannot be held indefinitely if no country will accept them for deportation in Zadvydas v. Davis. Enforcement of immigration law was reformed following the September 11 attacks, shifting focus to national security. The Immigration and Nationalization Service was split into the Citizenship and Immigration Services, the Immigration and Customs Enforcement, and the Customs and Border Protection.

==== 21st-century developments ====
In June 2001, in Zadvydas v. Davis the Supreme court ruled that non-citizens could not be detained indefinitely if removal was not "reasonably foreseeable." After the September 11, 2001 attacks, immigration enforcement shifted its focus heavily towards national security. Congress created the Department of Homeland Security on November 25, 2002.

The Obama administration sought an increase in detention and deportation, with a record removals of more than 3 million people. On June 15, 2012, Obama announced the Deferred Action for Childhood Arrivals (DACA), which offered temporary protection from removal and work authorization to undocumented immigrants who had arrived as children and met certain circumstances.

In May 2023, the U.S. ended its use of Title 42, a public health directive enacted during the COVID-19 pandemic that allowed for the rapid expulsion of migrants without standard asylum procedures. Over 2.8 million expulsions occurred under the policy. After it expired, U.S. Customs and Border Protection reported a record 249,785 migrant encounters at the U.S.-Mexico border in December 2023 alone.

In 2023, a federal judge in Texas reaffirmed that the Deferred Action for Childhood Arrivals (DACA) program was unlawful, although existing recipients were allowed to renew protections. As of early 2024, the program remained in place for current recipients, but new applications were still not being accepted.

In early 2024, bipartisan negotiations in Congress sought to tie immigration reform to foreign aid packages. Proposals included stricter asylum rules, expanded border enforcement, and expedited deportation procedures. Although the deal gained attention, it stalled due to disagreement over executive authority and humanitarian concerns.

In 2023, U.S. immigration authorities expanded use of the CBP One mobile app to manage asylum appointments at official ports of entry. The Biden administration promoted the app as a way to encourage orderly migration and reduce unauthorized crossings. However, advocacy groups raised concerns about limited daily appointment slots, connectivity issues, and unequal access to technology among migrants.

That same year, migrant encounters at the border increasingly involved people from countries like Venezuela, Haiti, and Guatemala, reflecting shifting regional migration patterns.

Despite repeated efforts to pass comprehensive immigration reform, major proposals continued to stall in Congress as of 2024.

On January 14, 2026 the State Department announced it was suspending visa processing for 75 nations including Somalia, Russia, Iran, Afghanistan, Brazil, Nigeria, and Thailand.

== Legal immigration ==
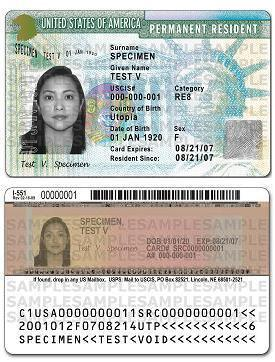
A U.S. green card denoting lawful permanent residency

The United States current arbitrary immigration system is based on the Nationality Act of 1965 and the Immigration Act of 1990 (INA). The Citizenship and Immigration Services are responsible for reviewing immigration applications and administering the immigration process. The INA allows the United States to grant approximately 675,000 permanent immigrant visas (green card) each year. In addition to the 675,000 permanent visas, the INA does not have a limit on the annual admission of U.S. citizens (e.g. spouses, parents, and children under 21 years of age). Family relationships, employment ties or humanitarian protection are main causes for immigrant seeking temporary or permanent U.S. residence. Each year the President is required to address the Congress and place an annual number of refugees to be admitted into the United States through the U.S. Refugee Admissions Program.

=== Visa policy ===
To seek entry to the United States, prospective immigrants must apply and be accepted for a travel visa. If a person legally migrates to the United States they may petition for an adjustment of status to become a lawful permanent resident, also known as a green card holder.. Approximately one million green cards are granted annually. Between 2013 and 2017, 45% of green card recipients were immediate relatives of American citizens, and another 21% were family sponsored. 14% of recipients received green cards for employment, and 13% received green cards as refugees. The Diversity Immigrant Visa program also grants 55,000 green cards for applicants around the world each year. Immigrants seeking temporary residence in the United States apply for a temporary visa. Approved applicants are authorized to stay for a certain length of time, and they may also be authorized to work or attend university in the United States, depending on their visa category.

Historically, laws such as the War Brides Act of 1945 was passed at the end of World War II and the American Homecoming Act of 1988 have been passed to allow immediate relatives of American service-members to immigrate to the United States following a major war. In 2013, the parole in place program was established to provide temporary residency for the immediate relatives of active duty military personnel while they applied for lawful permanent residency.

There are various nonimmigrant visa categories to seek entry into the United States for short periods of time and specific purposes. There are several requirements in order for someone to obtain a visa (e.g. visa fee, acceptable photograph, DS-160 visa application, required documents, visa interview appointment). The four main types of visas are tourist, immigration, student or work. To obtain a tourist visa one needs to get visitor visa (B-12) unless one qualifies for the Visa Waiver Program. International education is supported by the United States and welcomes foreign students and exchange visitors. To obtain a student visa, students need to be admitted into their chosen schools or program sponsors. A business visa requires a visitor visa (B-1) unless they qualify for the Visa Waiver Program. Temporary workers must qualify for an available visa category based on their employment purpose. Immigrants who want a permanent residency are granted a green card (immigrant visa), which allows for someone to work legally, travel abroad and return, bring children and spouse, and become eligible for citizenship. About one million green cards are granted annually. In 2019, 13.7% of foreign-born residents populated the United States.

=== Asylum policy ===
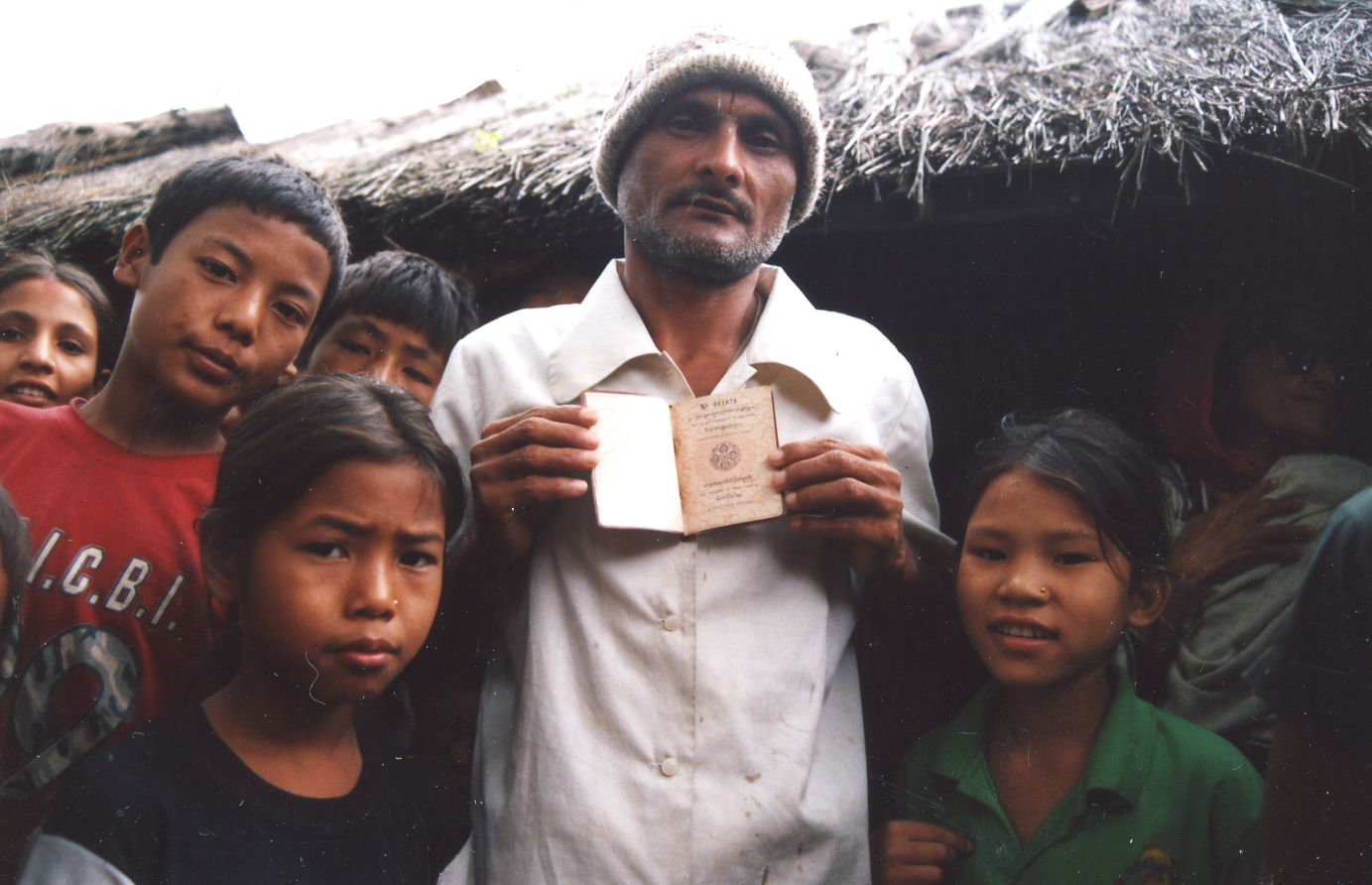
The U.S. offered to resettle 60,000 Bhutanese refugees in 2008. One depicted here with a Bhutanese passport.

Asylum policy of the United States is governed by the Refugee Act of 1980. Under this law, the United States recognizes refugees as individuals with a "well-founded fear of persecution" in line with the definition established by the United Nations. It also established the Office of Refugee Resettlement within the Department of Health and Human Services to oversee asylum policy. The Refugee Act also provides a mechanism to raise the cap on annual refugee intake.

Applying for refugee status is a separate process from applying for entry as an economic migrant, and refugees may apply from their home country or within their first year of entering the United States. Spouses and children of those seeking asylum are also considered in the application, and unaccompanied children can also apply independently. In order to qualify for asylum, applications must meet the legally recognized definition of a refugee, must have no record of serious crimes, and cannot have already been resettled in another country.

After the Refugee Act was passed in 1980, the United States accepted 207,000 refugees in the first year. In 2014, the number of asylum seekers accepted into the U.S. was about 120,000 compared to about 31,000 in the UK and 13,500 in Canada. Asylum policy in the United States was more heavily regulated under the Trump administration, significantly reducing the number of refugees accepted to the United States and reducing resources toward asylum application processing, creating a significant backlog. In 2021, the Biden administration raised the annual cap from President Trump's limit of 15,000 refugees to 62,500 with the intention of raising it to 125,000 the following year. As of 2020, the backlog of asylum claims consists of more than 290,000 applicants.

During the 1970s and 1980s, United States asylum policy focused on Southeastern Asia due to the Vietnam War. The United States increased the number of European refugees in 1989 by accepting Soviet refugees and in 1999 by accepting Kosovar refugees. During the 2000s, refugees primarily came from Somalia, Cuba, and Laos, with a significant increase in Burmese and Bhutanese refugees in 2008. As of 2016, refugees from the Democratic Republic of the Congo, Syria, and Myanmar make up nearly half of all refugees entering the United States.

=== Naturalization policy ===
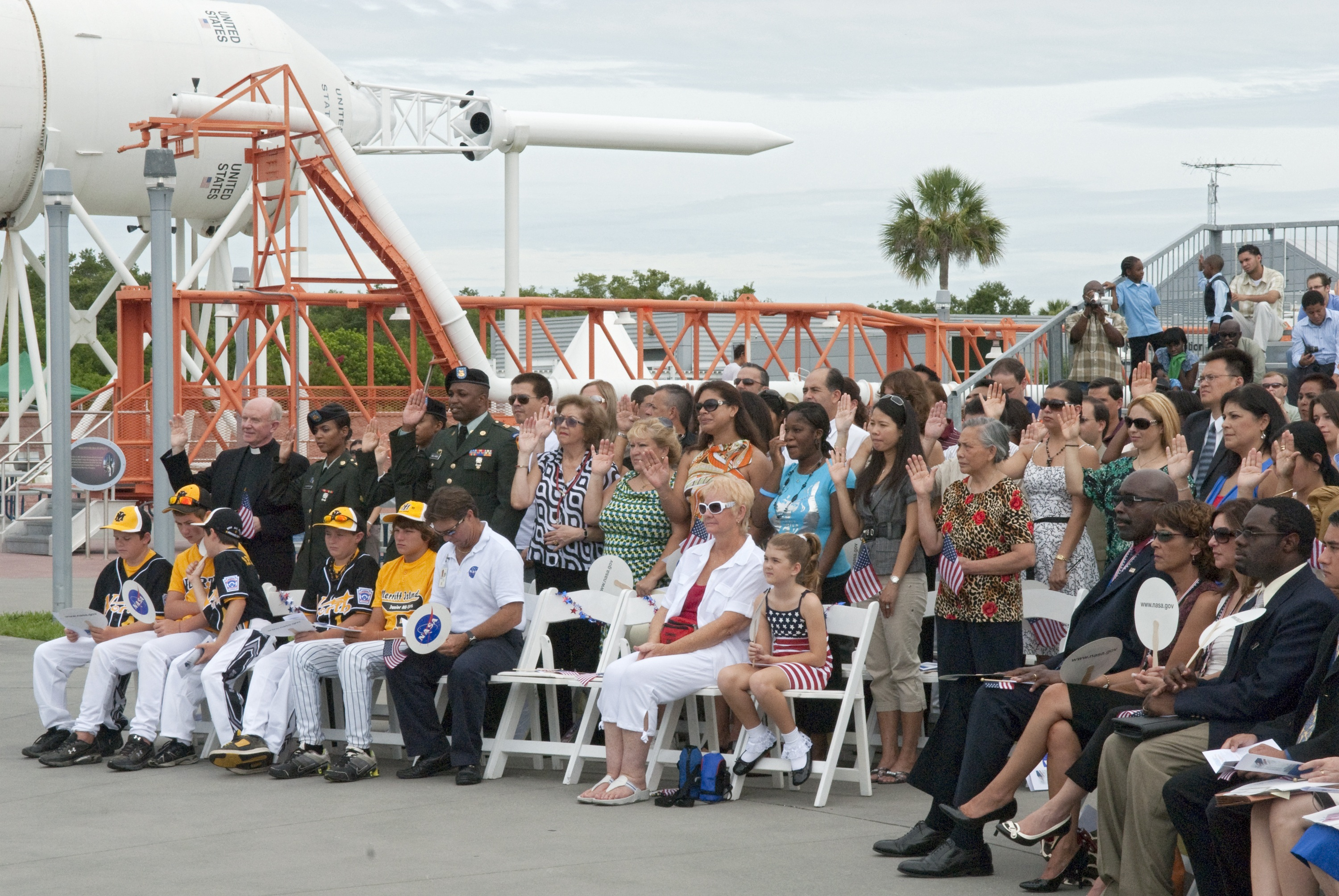
Immigrants to the United States take the Oath of Allegiance to become citizens. 2010.

Naturalization is the mechanism through which an immigrant becomes a citizen of the United States. Congress is directly empowered by the Constitution to legislate on naturalization. Naturalization in the United States is governed by the Immigration and Nationality Acts of 1952 and 1965, and it is overseen by the Citizenship and Immigration Services. To be eligible for naturalization, an applicant must be at least 18 years old, have established permanent residence for at least five years, have basic English proficiency, and have a basic knowledge of American civics. Applicants must also participate in an interview with the Citizenship and Immigration Services, to prove English proficiency and take the American Civics Test. 91% of applicants are successful in both the English and civics tests. Applicants that are granted naturalization take the Oath of Allegiance. During the 2010s, more than 7.3 million immigrants were naturalized. In 2020, Mexico, India, the Philippines, Cuba, and China were the most common countries of origin for immigrants.

The Supreme Court has ruled that multiple citizenship is legal in Kawakita v. United States and Schneider v. Rusk.

== Undocumented immigration ==
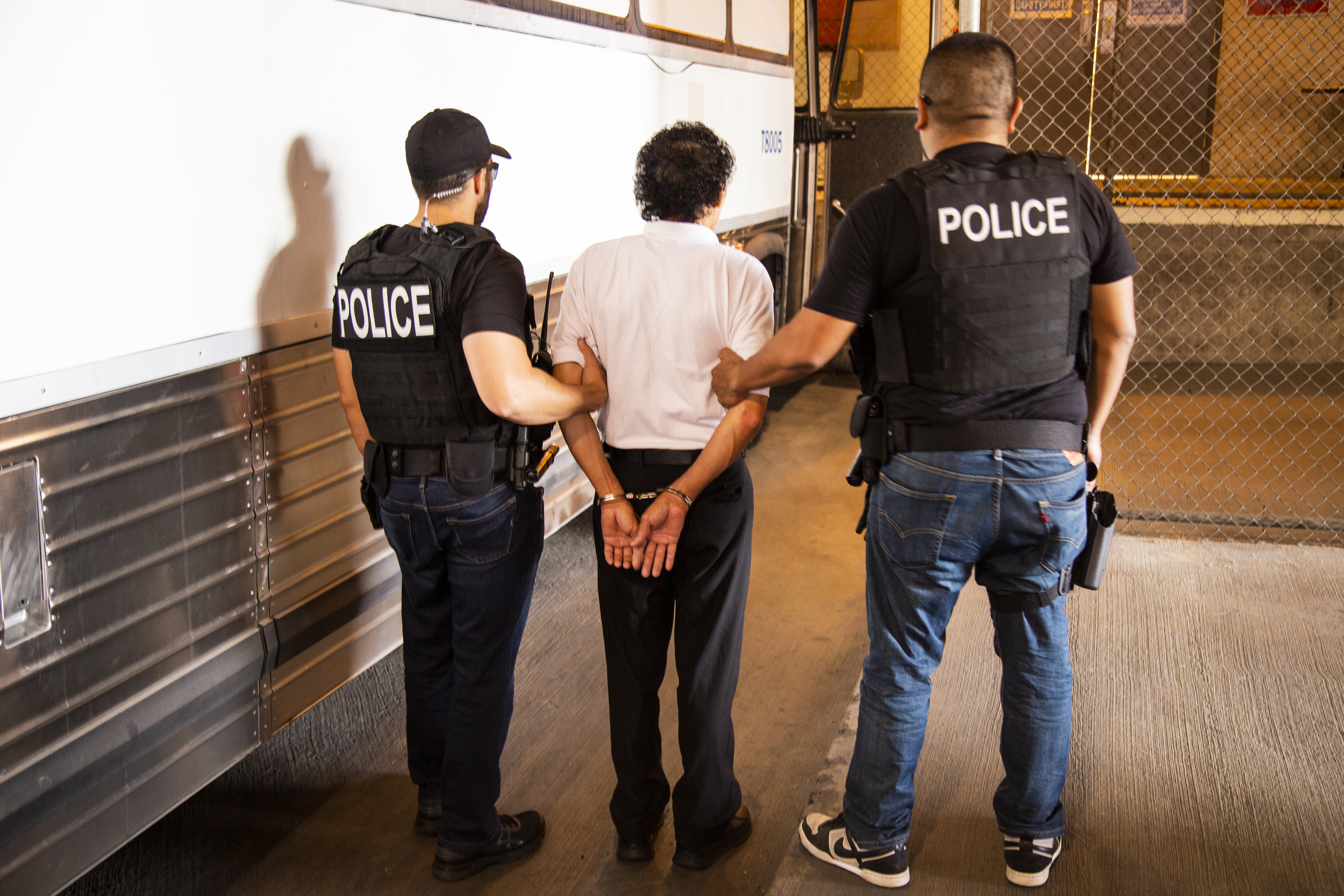
ICE agents arrest a fugitive suspected of human rights violations as part of Operation No Safe Haven. 2019.

An undocumented immigrant is anyone without current legal status in the United States. Also known as "unauthorized" or "illegal" immigrants, this broad category includes visa overstayers, DACA recipients, asylum seekers, those granted Temporary Protected Status, as well as those who have crossed without inspection at a border. Undocumented immigrants are not criminals; simply being without legal status is a civil violation, and many such immigrants have permission to remain in the country. Undocumented immigrants may be subject to removal from the United States if they fail to obtain status or are convicted of a crime. Policies regarding immigration are primarily regulated by the Immigration Reform and Control Act of 1986 (IRCA) and the undocumented Immigration Reform and Immigrant Responsibility Act of 1996 (IIRIRA). Immigration and Customs Enforcement (ICE) is responsible for the investigation of immigration-related crime and apprehension of immigrants with a final order of removal. The Supreme Court ruled in 1982 that undocumented children are entitled to enrollment in public schools in Plyler v. Doe. Under the Emergency Medical Treatment and Active Labor Act, undocumented immigrants are entitled to service from any hospital that accepts Medicare.

The undocumented Immigration is estimated to be between 11 and 12 million. The population of undocumented immigrants peaked in 2007 and has declined since that time. Mexico has been historically the largest country of origin for undocumented individuals, but "their numbers (and share of the total) have been declining" and as of 2016 Mexicans no longer make up a clear majority of immigrants, as they did in the past. Undocumented immigrants made up about 5% of the total U.S. civilian labor force in 2014. By the 2010s, an increasing share of U.S. undocumented immigrants were long-term residents; in 2015, 66% of adult unauthorized residents had lived in the country for at least ten years, while only 14% had lived in the U.S. for less than five years.

Amnesty provides lawful permanent residence or a path to citizenship to "illegal" immigrants. In 1986, the IRCA authorized amnesty for illegal immigrants that had resided in the United States since 1982. The immigration Reform and Control Act of 1986 included an amnesty program for undocumented immigrants who had reside in the United States since 1982 to facilitate this process. Approximately three million illegal immigrants were granted amnesty and achieved legal status under this law. Overall, studies show that amnesty programs have been found to have little overall effect on undocumented immigration rates. Supporters argue it provided practical solution for long-term residents, while opponents argue that it may had encourage additional unauthorized immigration.

=== Deferral policy ===
The United States has policies in place that provide for deferred action on removal of illegal immigrants. When illegal immigrants are placed under deferred action, the federal government does not take legal action against them for their immigration status and removal proceedings do not take place. The Reagan administration implemented the Family Fairness program in 1987. Following the passage of the IRCA, some illegal immigrants were granted legal status, but their immediate relatives were not. The Family Fairness program granted deferment to some immediate relatives of immigrants that obtained legal status under the Immigration Reform and Control Act. The program was expanded in 1990, and it was codified into law later that year under the Immigration Act of 1990.

The Obama administration implemented the Deferred Action for Childhood Arrivals (DACA) program in 2012 to support illegal immigrants that arrived in the United States as children. Under this program, eligible illegal immigrants are granted a two-year deferral from removal and be authorized to legally work in the United States. The two-year period is also subject to renewal. Eligibility requirements include being between the age of 15 and 31, having come to the United States before reaching the age of 16, having lived in the United States continuously for at least five years, and having any of the following: a high school diploma or GED, an honorable discharge from the military or current enrollment as a student. Applicants are also limited by criminal records or other threats to public safety or national security. Children of legal migrants do not qualify for DACA protection because they entered the country legally. The Obama administration sought to implement a second deferral program, the Deferred Action for Parents of Americans (DAPA), in 2014. Under this program, deferment would be granted to eligible illegal immigrants that are the parents of American citizens or lawful permanent residents. It was challenged in United States v. Texas and eventually rescinded by the Trump administration before it was implemented.

=== Removal policy ===
Removal proceedings are governed by the Illegal Immigration Reform and Immigrant Responsibility Act of 1996. The Executive Office for Immigration Review operates immigration courts, which oversee removal proceedings of immigrants. An immigration judge presides over removal proceedings, which determine whether an immigrant is subject to removal from the United States. Immigrants facing deportation are eligible to apply for cancellation of removal if they have established residence in the United States for at least 10 years, have not committed serious crimes, and provide for a lawful American resident.

Most immigration proceedings are civil matters, although crimes committed to enter the United States, including fraud or evasion of border enforcement, are still subject to criminal charges. As immigration proceedings are civil matters, immigrants do not receive Sixth Amendment protections such as the right to counsel and the right to a jury trial, although Fifth Amendment protections have been found to apply. As removal proceedings are conducted by an executive agency, they are under the jurisdiction of the executive branch rather than the judicial branch of government. The Attorney General has authority over immigration courts, and appeals are heard by the Board of Immigration Appeals. Some have called for immigration courts to be moved to the judicial branch to prevent abuse by strengthening separation of powers.

Whether people who are awaiting a decision on their deportation are detained or released to live in the United States in the meantime (possibly paying bail) is a matter of both law and discretion of the Justice Department. The policy has varied over time and differs for those with crimes (including entry outside an official checkpoint) versus civil infractions. The 2001 Supreme Court case Zadvydas v. Davis held that immigrants who cannot be deported because no country will accept them cannot be detained indefinitely. In some cases, immigrants may be subject to an expedited removal, resulting in removal without the involvement of an immigration court. Immigrants subject to removal proceedings may also withdraw an application or voluntarily depart.

In October 2021, the U.S. Department of Homeland Security (DHS) issued a policy memorandum restricting enforcement and removal actions in or near sensitive locations, such as schools, hospitals, parades, and places of worship. The policy was officially rescinded in January 2025. However, as of March 2025, DHS announced it continues to follow the October 2021 policy at about 1,400 places of worship across 36 states, to comply with a court order.

California Assemblyman and speaker Robert A. Rivas purposed legislation that all ICE agents must remain unmasked and propperly identify themselves while in California. Govenor Gavin Newsom, signed the purposed legislation into law on as California Senate Bill 805, which mandates for strict attire while connducting raids within the state of California. This was taken from a press release, "At an event in Los Angeles attended by several Assembly and Latino Caucus members, Governor Gavin Newsom signed SB 805, the “No Vigilantes Act,” which requires ICE, Border Patrol, and Homeland Security agents operating in California to clearly identify themselves while conducting operations. This law immediately goes into effect and will ensure transparency and accountability for federal immigration agents."

== See also ==
- Immigration lawyer
- Immigration reform in the United States
- List of United States immigration laws
