= Keeping Families Together (United States immigration policy) =

Policy effective from June to November 2024

Keeping Families Together (KFT) is a United States immigration policy for certain noncitizen spouses and noncitizen stepchildren of American citizens to request parole in place. It was announced by U.S. President Joe Biden through executive order on 18 June 2024 and implemented on 19 August 2024. The USCIS program was intended to provide a pathway to work authorization, permanent residency and eventual citizenship for unlawful persons married to American citizens residing ten years or more. Sixteen American states, led by their designated Attorneys General, filed a lawsuit challenging the program's legality and enforceability claiming that such a program was unlawful. In response, an additional nineteen American states filed a brief for amici curiae in support of the Federal government and the KFT program.

On 7 November 2024 the U.S. Federal Judge John Campbell Barker of Tyler, Texas adjudicated the program as both non-enforceable and unlawful. Citing the final judgment of his federal court, Barker ruled the lack of authority of President Biden from U.S. Congress to implement the program as immigration policy.

== Background ==
The Keeping Families Together program was introduced on 18 June 2024.

== Parole in Place ==
The program known as Parole in Place (PIP) was designed to allow foreign nationals without any lawful documented status, never granted any lawful entry of inspection or travel visa, and married to American citizens the opportunity to adjust their status while residing within the United States, instead of waiting for a consular processing and personal interview at a U.S. Consulate at their country of origin.

The process of achieving this parole further required a non-refundable filing fee of US$580 and rigorous documentation of ten years residency within the United States. Furthermore, it required a validated proof of marriage license solemnized before 17 June 2024, with various discretionary restrictions of any criminal record via biometrical inspection and proof of good moral character of the applicant.

== Standing Argument ==
In their suit, Texas argued standing based on financial harm, pointing to a potential increase in state costs for programs like SNAP, healthcare, and education due to the KFT Rule. The court accepted that these costs were "substantially likely" but noted that the standing argument relied on future projections, such as the number of minors who would require state services. Notably, Texas was the only plaintiff state to present the standing argument, as other states conceded.

Texas's standing was challenged by the defendants on two main points. First, that Texas couldn’t show a legally recognized injury, as its harm—downstream public expenditures from immigration enforcement—was too indirect and speculative. The Supreme Court's ruling in Priorities reinforced this, stating Texas’s injury, based on the presence of noncitizens, was too distant to meet Article III requirements. Second, that even if Texas had a valid injury, it failed to show that a court ruling would resolve the issue, as an injunction couldn’t directly remove noncitizens or affect the government’s discretionary authority.

== Judgment ==
The program was adjudicated as unlawful and unenforceable by the U.S. Federal Judge John Campbell Barker at the U.S. District Court for the Eastern District of Texas in Tyler on 7 November 2024.

On 13 November 2024, the USCIS formally issued a directive complying with the U.S. Federal Court Order and shall no longer adjudicate its pending cases. Accordingly, it ceased accepting applications for the program, along with canceling any scheduled biometric appointments for current applicants.

USCIS issued refunds for all collected KFT application fees.

== See also ==
- Family Fairness Program
- Deferred Action for Childhood Arrivals (DACA)
- Deferred Action for Parents of Americans (DAPA)
- DREAM Act
- Immigration to the United States
