= United States v. Texas (2016) =

- Supreme Court of the United States

Argued April 18, 2016 Decided June 23, 2016
- Full case name: United States of America, et al., Petitioners v. State of Texas, et al.
- Docket no.: 15-674
- Citations: 579 U.S. 547 (more) 136 S. Ct. 2271; 195 L. Ed. 2d 638

Case history
- Prior: Issuing preliminary injunction, 86 F. Supp. 3d 591 (S.D. Tex. 2015); stay denied, 787 F.3d 733 (5th Cir. 2015); preliminary injunction affirmed, 809 F.3d 134 (5th Cir. 2015); cert. granted, 136 S. Ct. 906 (2016).

Holding
- The judgment was affirmed by an equally divided court.

Court membership
- Chief Justice John Roberts Associate Justices Anthony Kennedy · Clarence Thomas; Ruth Bader Ginsburg · Stephen Breyer; Samuel Alito · Sonia Sotomayor; Elena Kagan

Case opinion
- Per curiam

Laws applied
- Take Care Clause of the U.S. Constitution, Administrative Procedure Act, United States immigration legislation from 1952, 1965, 1986, 1990, 1996, etc.

United States v. Texas, 579 U.S. 547 (2016), is a United States Supreme Court case regarding the constitutionality of the Deferred Action for Parents of Americans (DAPA) program.

In a one-line per curiam decision, an equally divided Court affirmed the lower-court injunction blocking the President Barack Obama's program. The case was decided by an eight-member bench due to the death of Justice Antonin Scalia.

== Background ==
On June 27, 2013, the U.S. Senate's Gang of Eight successfully passed a bipartisan comprehensive immigration reform bill. However, the bill stalled in the Republican-controlled House of Representatives. On June 9, 2014, House Whip Kevin McCarthy announced that House Republicans had enough votes to pass the bill. The next day House Majority Leader Eric Cantor lost his primary election. On June 30, Speaker John Boehner announced that he would not bring the bill to a vote. President Barack Obama called it a "year of obstruction".

That same day, the President delivered remarks in the White House Rose Garden to announce that he would take unilateral executive action because "America cannot wait [for Congress] forever". After months of behind the scenes negotiations with interest groups and lobbyists, Obama announced DAPA on November 20 during a primetime televised address to the nation.

In a now withdrawn opinion supporting DAPA the Office of Legal Counsel said the program was "consistent with congressional policy". Supporters of the DAPA program have analogized it to the Family Fairness program. The Family Fairness program, under Presidents Ronald Reagan and George H. W. Bush, offered discretionary relief called "extended voluntary departure" to the spouses and children of aliens who were legalized under the Immigration Reform and Control Act of 1986. Critics have noted that DAPA was met by significant opposition in Congress.

Homeland Security Secretary Jeh Johnson released two memorandums directing the U.S. Immigration and Customs Enforcement Bureau to make unauthorized immigrants who lacked criminal histories the lowest priority for removal, and to grant deferred action to illegal immigrants who are the parents of a U.S. citizen or lawful permanent resident.

The New York Times reported that "more than 10 million people live in households with at least one potentially DAPA-eligible adult" and that "two-thirds of these adults have lived in the United States for at least 10 years". Over half the unauthorized immigrants eligible for the President's delayed deportation live in California, Texas, and New York.

Two weeks later, Texas Attorney General Greg Abbott sued in the United States District Court for the Southern District of Texas. The suit was joined by twenty-five other states, with 2.2 million of the 3.6 million unauthorized immigrants eligible for DAPA residing in states that did not join the lawsuit.

=== United States District Court ===
On February 16, 2015, United States District Judge Andrew S. Hanen in Brownsville, Texas, issued a preliminary injunction against an executive action taken by President Barack Obama that would have given illegal immigrants legal status and protection and let them apply for work permits. The U.S. government on February 23, 2015, asked the Court to lift the injunction while it appealed his ruling to the 5th U.S. Circuit Court of Appeals in New Orleans; it also proposed that the Court could issue a partial stay that would allow every state except for Texas to start implementing DAPA.

In an opinion and order published on April 7, 2015, Hanen denied the Government's request to stay the preliminary injunction. He affirmed the earlier ruling that the plaintiff states had standing; cited statements made by President Obama regarding the applicability of the Administrative Procedure Act (APA) that DHS employees would "suffer consequences" if they failed to follow the DHS Directive; denied the DOJ request to apply for the injunction only to Texas; and addressed the issue of irreparable harm with regard to both the federal government and to the states.

On the same day, the Court issued a separate order criticizing the federal government for granting three-year periods of deferred action to 108,081 individuals between the announcement of DAPA and the preliminary injunction, despite earlier statements made to the court by the Department of Justice that no action would be taken on these applications. The Court reserved the right to impose sanctions against the federal government's counsel for misrepresenting facts.

=== United States Court of Appeals ===
The Obama Administration appealed the order for a preliminary injunction and asked the United States Court of Appeals for the Fifth Circuit in New Orleans to stay the district court's injunction pending appeal. On May 26, 2015, the administration's motion for a stay was denied by a divided three-member motions panel, over a dissent by Judge Stephen A. Higginson, meaning that the government could not implement DAPA until the Fifth Circuit ruled on the appeal of the injunction order itself. Arguments were heard on an expedited basis on July 10, 2015. On November 9, 2015, a three-member panel of the Fifth Circuit affirmed the district court's preliminary injunction, over one dissent.

The divided circuit court affirmed the preliminary injunction and ordered the case back to the district court for trial. Judge Jerry Edwin Smith, joined by Judge Jennifer Walker Elrod agreed with the district court that Texas has standing because of the cost of issuing driver's licenses to undocumented immigrants and that President Obama's order violated the rulemaking requirements of the Administrative Procedure Act. The majority made a new finding that the Immigration and Nationality Act "flatly does not permit" deferred action. Judge Carolyn Dineen King dissented, arguing that prosecutorial discretion makes the case non-justiciable, and that there had been "no justification" for the circuit court's delay in the ruling.

== Supreme Court of the United States ==
On November 10, 2015, the Justice Department announced it would ask the Supreme Court to reverse. Texas Attorney General Ken Paxton attempted to prolong consideration of the case until the next October term but the Supreme Court only granted him an eight-day extension to file his opposition brief. The Justice Department further hastened the case by waiving its right to file a reply brief. On January 19, 2016, the Supreme Court agreed to review the case. The Court took the unusual step of asking for a briefing on the new constitutional question as to whether or not DAPA violates the Take Care Clause.

Due to the subsequent death of Justice Antonin Scalia, the case was decided by eight justices. On April 18, 2016, the Court heard ninety minutes of oral arguments from Donald B. Verrilli Jr., the Solicitor General of the United States, an attorney for the Mexican American Legal Defense and Educational Fund as an intervenor in support of the Government, Texas Solicitor General Scott Keller for the several states, and a Bancroft PLLC attorney representing the United States House of Representatives as a friend of Texas. Commentators complained that the arguments were "one of the most flagrant examples in recent memory of a naked political dispute masquerading as a legal one".

On June 23, 2016, the Supreme Court announced it had deadlocked 4–4 in a decision that read, in its entirety, "The judgment is affirmed by an equally divided Court." The ruling set no precedent and simply left in place the lower court's preliminary injunction blocking the program. The case may reach the Supreme Court again after Judge Hanen has held a trial.

President Obama immediately held a press conference criticizing the decision, where he blamed "spasms of politics around immigration and fear-mongering" as well as Senate Republicans for refusing to consider his nominee for the Supreme Court, Merrick Garland. Former acting Solicitor General Walter Dellinger observed "seldom have the hopes of so many been crushed by so few words". Texas Attorney General Paxton praised the result because "This is a major setback to President Obama's attempts to expand executive power, and a victory for those who believe in the separation of powers and the rule of law."

== Further developments ==
=== Sanctions on Department of Justice attorneys ===
While the case was awaiting a decision from the United States Supreme Court, trial court judge Hanen issued a temporary hold on three-year renewals of work authorization for some illegal immigrants. The federal government gave three-year renewals of work authorization for 2,500 young, illegal immigrants, despite Judge Hanen's order. The federal government later reversed the three-year extensions for those 2,500 people, and attorneys for the Department of Justice said the renewals of work authorizations were made in error. Judge Hanen accused the attorneys of purposely misleading his court, he barred them from appearing in his courtroom, he demanded ethics classes for the attorneys, and he ordered other sanctions for those who argued the case in his courtroom. Judge Hanen also ordered Attorney General Loretta Lynch to appoint someone within the department to ensure compliance with his order.

=== Trump administration ===
On November 18, 2016, attorneys for both parties filed a joint motion to stay proceeding until one month after President Donald Trump's inauguration. On June 15, 2017, new Homeland Security Secretary John F. Kelly signed a memo rescinding DAPA, ending the matter. DHS's announcement clarified that the new memo does not affect Deferred Action for Childhood Arrivals, leading the White House to announce it had not decided if it will or will not keep that other policy. However, on September 5, 2017, the Trump Administration announced that they planned to end DACA if Congress was unable to pass it into law within six months.
