= Mila Sohoni =

American legal scholar

- Born: Sharmila Sohoni; 1978 or 1979 (age 47–48)

Academic background
- Education: Harvard University (A.B., J.D.); Univ. of Cambridge (M. Phil.)

Academic work
- Discipline: Administrative law
- Institutions: Stanford Law School; University of San Diego School of Law

Sharmila Sohoni is an American lawyer and legal scholar who specializes in administrative law. Sohoni is a professor of law and the John A. Wilson distinguished faculty scholar at Stanford Law School. She taught for ten years at the University of San Diego School of Law, where she was the Herzog research professor of law and associate dean of faculty. She is an appointed public member of the Administrative Conference of the United States and an elected member of the American Law Institute.

== Early life and career ==
Sohoni was born to Neera Kuckreja Sohoni, a writer and scholar of women's issues in Mumbai, and Venkat Sohoni, a manufacturing executive.

She graduated magna cum laude from Harvard College and earned a master's degree in the history and philosophy of science from the University of Cambridge. She then worked as a science and technology correspondent for The Economist from 2000 to 2002. She then received a Juris Doctor degree from Harvard Law School. After law school, she was a law clerk to Judith W. Rogers of the U.S. Court of Appeals for the D.C. Circuit. From 2006 to 2011, she was an associate at the law firm Jenner & Block LLP. From 2011 to 2013, she taught at the New York University School of Law. She then moved to the University of San Diego School of Law, where she became a full professor of law in 2017. While there, she became the Herzog research professor of law and associate dean of faculty. She was a visiting professor of law at the University of Pennsylvania School of Law and Harvard Law School in 2018. In 2022, she was appointed a public member of the Administrative Conference of the United States. In 2024, she moved to Stanford Law School as a professor of law in June, and was elected in October as a member of the American Law Institute. As of 2025 she is the John A. Wilson distinguished faculty scholar.

== Work ==
Sohoni is known for her work on the major questions doctrine, which she has said "looms over any big agency action that the administration wants to do" and "allows courts a great deal of leeway to pick and choose which agency actions to strike down and which to sustain".

Her scholarship has also been important to the legal debate over universal injunctions and over whether the Administrative Procedure Act allows courts to vacate a regulation universally or only as to its application to parties challenging it. In The Lost History of the "Universal" Injunction, Sohoni identified Lewis Publishing Co. v. Morgan (1913) as a universal injunction issued by the Supreme Court much earlier than the first examples critics had identified from the 1960s. According to Professor Doug Rendelman, she "applied scrupulous research to refute the national government injunction's critics' arguments that the 'traditional' view was that an injunction 'benefitted' only the party plaintiff and that the national government injunction is a recent innovation". As to universal vacatur, Justice Brett Kavanaugh has agreed with Sohoni's view, citing her article The Power To Vacate a Rule.

== Personal life ==
Sohoni is married to Christopher Egleson, a partner at the law firm Sidley Austin.

== Published full-length articles ==
- Mila Sohoni, The Past and Future of Universal Vacatur, 133 Yale L.J. 2305 (2024).
- Mila Sohoni, The Puzzle of Procedural Originalism, 72 Duke L.J. 941 (2023).
- Mila Sohoni, The Major Questions Quartet, 136 Harv. L. Rev. 262 (2022).
- Mila Sohoni, Equity and the Sovereign, 97 Notre Dame L. Rev. 2019 (2022).
- Mila Sohoni, The Lost History of the 'Universal' Injunction, 133 Harv. L. Rev. 920 (2020).
- Mila Sohoni, The Power to Vacate a Rule, 88 Geo. Wash. L. Rev. 1121 (2020).
- Mila Sohoni, The Trump Administration and the Law of the Lochner Era, 107 Geo. L.J. 1324 (2019).
- Mila Sohoni, On Dollars and Deference: Agencies, Spending, and Economic Rights, 66 Duke L.J. 1677 (2017).
- Mila Sohoni, Crackdowns, 103 Va. L. Rev. 31 (2017).
- Mila Sohoni, The Administrative Constitution in Exile, 57 Wm. & Mary L. Rev. 923 (2016).
- Mila Sohoni, The Power to Privilege, 163 U. Pa. L. Rev. 487 (2015).
- Mila Sohoni, Agency Adjudication and Judicial Non-Delegation: An Article III Canon, 107 Nw. U. L. Rev. 1569 (2013).
- Mila Sohoni, Notice and the New Deal, 62 Duke L.J. 1169 (2013).
- Mila Sohoni, The Idea of "Too Much Law", 80 Fordham L. Rev. 1585 (2012).
