= Richard W. Bennett =

American judge (born 1974)

Richard Wesley Bennett

Judge of the United States District Court for the Southern District of Texas
- Designate
- Assuming office TBD
- Appointed by: Donald Trump
- Succeeding: Andrew Hanen

Personal details
- Born: Richard Wesley Bennett; 1974 (age 51–52) Louisville, Kentucky
- Education: Texas Christian University (B.A.); Southern Methodist University (J.D.)

Richard "Rick" Wesley Bennett (born 1974) is a United States magistrate judge of the United States District Court for the Southern District of Texas. He is also a designate United States district judge of the same court.

== Education ==
Born in 1974 in Louisville, Kentucky, Bennett received a Bachelor of Arts degree in 1997 from Texas Christian University and a Juris Doctor in 2000 from the Dedman School of Law at Southern Methodist University. From 2003 to 2004, he was a law clerk for Magistrate Judge Marcia A. Crone of the United States District Court for the Southern District of Texas and from 2004 to 2005, he was again a law clerk for now United States District Judge Crone of the United States District Court for the Eastern District of Texas.

== Career ==
Bennett is currently a United States magistrate judge of the United States District Court for the Southern District of Texas since 2024. From 2014 to 2024, he served in the United States Attorney's Office for the Southern District of Texas as a Special Assistant United States Attorney from 2014 to 2016, and as an Assistant United States Attorney from 2016 to 2024. From 2010 to 2016, he served with the United States Immigration and Customs Enforcement Office of the Principal Legal Advisor as Assistant Chief Counsel. From 2009 to 2010, he was a Partner with the law firm of Jones Bennett LLP. From 2006 to 2009, he was an Assistant United States Attorney in the United States Attorney's Office for the Western District of Texas. From 2005 to 2006, he was an Associate Attorney with the law firm of Chamberlain Hrdlicka. From 2000 to 2003, he was an Assistant District Attorney with the Galveston County District Attorney's Office.

=== Nomination to district court ===
On August 18, 2026, President Donald Trump announced his intention to nominate Bennett to an undesignated seat on the United States District Court for the Southern District of Texas. On November 10, 2026, the Senate Judiciary Committee reported his nomination to the full Senate on a 12–10 party line vote. The U.S. Senate confirmed his nomination by a vote of 49–43 on November 20, 2026.

== Personal ==
Bennett resides in Conroe, Texas.

Legal offices
Preceded by Andrew Hanen	Judge of the United States District Court for the Southern District of Texas; Taking office 2026	Designate
