= Broader Options for Americans Act =

- Long title: Broader Options for Americans Act
- Nicknames: vehicle for immigration legislation

Legislative history
- Introduced in the House as H.R. 2579 by Pat Tiberi (R–OH) on May 19, 2017; Committee consideration by House Committee on Ways and Means; Passed the House on June 15, 2017 (265–144)

The Broader Options for Americans Act (H. R. 2579) was a bill introduced in the United States House of Representatives in 2017. The bill was sponsored by U.S. Representative Pat Tiberi (R–OH). It would have enabled some people who lost their jobs to use tax credits offered under the American Health Care Act to receive continued coverage under their employer-sponsored health insurance plans. This bill would have no effect until the American Health Care Act of 2017 was enacted into law, but that did not happen.

In February 2018, this bill was used as the vehicle for immigration legislation which was debated in the United States Senate. The immigration legislation aimed to resolve the status of undocumented immigrants, who were protected under the Deferred Action for Childhood Arrivals program after the program was rescinded by the Trump administration. The legislation would also introduce additional immigration reforms. This bill allowed senators to offer amendments and compete for 60 votes to pass the Senate.

== Amendments voted on in the Senate ==
Below is a list of amendments to this bill with actions taken in the Senate during the immigration debate. All of the amendments mentioned below failed to advance.

Amendment	Amends	Introduced by	Motion to Invoke Cloture		
Amendment	Amends	Introduced by	Voting date	Votes	Status
S.Amdt. 1955	S.Amdt. 1958	Chris Coons (D–DE)	Feb 15, 2018	52–47	cloture motion rejected
S.Amdt. 1948	S.Amdt. 1959	Pat Toomey (R–PA)	Feb 15, 2018	54–45	cloture motion rejected
S.Amdt. 1958	H.R. 2579	Chuck Schumer (D–NY)	Feb 15, 2018	54–45	cloture motion rejected
S.Amdt. 1959	H.R. 2579	Chuck Grassley (R–IA)	Feb 15, 2018	39–60	cloture motion rejected
