= Andrew Hanen =

American judge (born 1953)

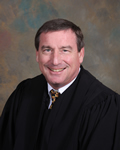

Senior Judge of the United States District Court for the Southern District of Texas
- Incumbent
- Assumed office January 2, 2025

Judge of the United States District Court for the Southern District of Texas
- In office May 10, 2002 – January 2, 2025
- Appointed by: George W. Bush
- Preceded by: Filemon Vela Sr.
- Succeeded by: Richard W. Bennett

Personal details
- Born: Andrew Scott Hanen; 1953 (age 72–73) Elgin, Illinois, U.S.
- Party: Republican
- Education: Denison University (BA); Baylor University (JD)

Andrew Scott Hanen (born 1953) is an American lawyer who serves as a senior United States district judge of the United States District Court for the Southern District of Texas.

== Early life and education ==
Hanen was born in 1953, in Elgin, Illinois and raised in Waco, Texas. He received a Bachelor of Arts, with honors, from Denison University in 1975, majoring in economics and political science. He received his Juris Doctor from Baylor Law School in 1978.

== Career ==
Hanen began his legal career as a briefing attorney to Joe R. Greenhill, chief justice of the Supreme Court of Texas, from 1978 to 1979. He then worked in private practice in Houston from 1979 to 2002. In 1992, Hanen was nominated by then-President George H. W. Bush to be a United States district judge, but the nomination lapsed.

=== Federal judicial service ===
On January 23, 2002, he was nominated by President George W. Bush to a seat on the United States District Court for the Southern District of Texas vacated by Filemon Vela Sr., who assumed senior status. Hanen was confirmed by the United States Senate on May 9, 2002, by a 97–0 vote. He received his commission on May 10, 2002. He assumed senior status on January 2, 2025.

Hanen maintained chambers in Brownsville, Texas from 2002 until 2018, when he relocated to Houston, also within the Southern District.

=== Notable cases ===
During the sentencing of a convicted child smuggler in December 2013, Hanen sharply criticized the United States Department of Homeland Security in an opinion that "veered far from the matter at hand" and "that quickly won rave reviews on right-wing news sites." Not only did he criticize the policy of reuniting children with their illegal immigrant mothers, he further rebuked the department for not prosecuting this child's mother. Hanen wrote, "DHS should cease telling the citizens of the United States that it is enforcing our border security laws because it is not. Even worse, it is helping those who violate these laws." In February 2015, Hanen granted the State of Texas's motion for a nationwide preliminary injunction barring President Barack Obama from carrying out the Deferred Action for Parents of Americans (DAPA) program. In United States v. Texas, that ruling was affirmed by an equally divided Supreme Court of the United States on June 23, 2016 (with an eight-member bench due to the death of Justice Antonin Scalia).

Hanen made national news for related assertions and sanctions which were later withdrawn. On May 19, 2016, while the case was awaiting a decision at the Supreme Court, Hanen demanded that some 3,000 Department of Justice lawyers in 26 states take ethics classes, and ordered other sanctions for those who argued Texas v. United States, involving President Obama's immigration executive actions. Hanen did not explain why he extended his sanctions to attorneys who had no involvement in the case. Hanen accused Justice Department's lawyers of lying to him during arguments in the case, and barred them from appearing in his courtroom. He accused the department of "a calculated plan of unethical conduct". Hanen further ordered Attorney General Loretta Lynch to appoint someone within the department to ensure compliance with his order.

Hanen also ordered U.S. immigration officials to turn over, within weeks, the names and addresses of 50,000 people who received deferral under the expanded deferred action initiative. The National Immigration Law Center, the American Civil Liberties Union (ACLU) Immigrants' Rights Project, and the ACLU of Texas petitioned the United States Court of Appeals for the Fifth Circuit to vacate the order or postpone the deadline. Separately, the Justice Department argued in a filing in the district court that Hanen's ordered sanctions "exceed the scope of [the court's] authority and unjustifiably impose irreparable injury on the Department of Justice, the Department of Homeland Security and thousands of innocent third parties." The Justice Department also argued that additional ethics courses could cost up to $7.8 million over five years.

On June 7, 2016, Hanen stayed his order requiring ethics courses for federal attorneys and requiring U.S. immigration officials to turn over the names and addresses until August 22, 2016. On January 19, 2017, Hanen withdrew the sanctions in the order issued on May 19, 2016, as well as his demand that Immigration and Customs Enforcement (ICE) turn over personal information of 50,000 DACA recipients, stating: "This Court finds upon [DOJ's] newly filed evidence, that the statements in question, though repeated on multiple occasions, were not the product of a bad faith intent to deceive the Court or that they were made with malice."

On July 16, 2021, Hanen ruled that the Deferred Action for Childhood Arrivals (DACA) program was unconstitutional, and provisionally blocked approvals of all new applications nationwide while allowing the receipt of such new applications. The ruling did not immediately cancel the protected status of existing recipients.

On January 28, 2022, Hanen blocked enforcement of Texas's anti-BDS law. The case was brought about by Palestinian-American contractor Rasmy Hassouna, who had refused to renew his business's, A&R Engineering and Testing Inc., contract with the city of Houston due to the law. Hanen ruled that the law violated Hassouna's First Amendment right to freedom of speech.

On September 13, 2023, Hanen again held that DACA was unlawful, and extended the ongoing injunction preventing the government from processing new applications for the program. He declined the request, from the states challenging DACA, to order that the program be ended within two years.

=== 2020 Texas voting case ===
Two days before a decision was rendered in this case, Slate Magazine had described him as "one of the most notoriously partisan conservatives in the federal judiciary."

On November 2, 2020, Hanen heard a suit against officeholder Chris Hollins, the Harris County Clerk, filed by Texas state representative Steve Toth and a group of Texas Republican candidates who sought to invalidate about 127,000 drive-thru votes in Harris County, Texas. Toth said Harris County exceeded its state constitutional authority by allowing drive-thru voting as an alternative to walk-in voting during the COVID-19 pandemic, a change Toth argued could be determined solely by the Texas Legislature. Democrats countered that his request would disenfranchise all voters who had previously cast drive-thru votes in good faith.

Hanen dismissed the Republicans' lawsuit, stating they needed to prove the existence of an "evil motive" to have the ballots thrown out and he said they failed to do so. Hanen also ruled that the plaintiffs who filed the lawsuit lacked standing and that drive-through voting could proceed on election day, but because the statute allowed for casting votes in "buildings," and he ruled that tent voting could not be included. Hanen's judgment retained the validity of the early drive-up votes that had been cast prior to his decision. It did not dismiss the possibility of whether those drive-thru sites comported with the state's election law. It did not preclude votes cast subsequent to his decision from being challenged, saying, "I would not vote in a drive-thru out of my concern whether that's legal or not." He ordered Harris County to retain and segregate records of any drive-thru ballots cast on Election Day because of the possibility of future legal challenges. Hollins chose to close nine of Harris County's 10 drive-thru voting sites on Election Day. He said, "I cannot in good faith encourage voters to cast their votes in tents if that puts their votes at risk."

Hanen's decision was appealed by the Republican plaintiffs to the United States Court of Appeals for the Fifth Circuit, but their appeal was rejected.

Republican activist Steve Hotze and three Republican candidates sued the Clerk, Hollins, seeking to halt drive-through voting after the Texas Supreme Court ruled that the manner of voting could proceed. Richard Mithoff, a Harris County attorney said, "We're very grateful that we saved 127,000 votes from both parties," standing with Hollins and other Texas Democrats outside the federal courthouse in downtown Houston. Hollins said the county's staff of 11,000 election workers were ready to count the early drive-through votes. Republicans requested that the courts stop the county from tabulating the votes until after the resolution of their claims.

Before the decision, Harris County Clerk Chris Hollins said that drive-through voting would continue on election day at 10 sites, in addition to in-person voting at more than 800 polling places. More than a million registered voters in the county still had not cast ballots, he said, adding that Republicans had filed almost a dozen lawsuits to constrict the intended expanded ability to exercise the franchise. "They will have the same access to the polls that their neighbors have had," Hollins said. "We're proud to be upholding democracy at a time when it is under attack." He said the case was just the latest in nearly a dozen lawsuits brought by Texas Republicans to block expanded voter access.

In October, Republican Gov. Greg Abbott had limited every county to a single drop site for mailed votes, forcing Harris County to close 11 additional sites and voters to drive several hours to drop off their ballots. Republicans also successfully sued to block Harris County from mailing ballots to all those eligible unless they requested them.

Hollins had previously said that drive-through voting would continue on election day at 10 sites, in addition to in-person voting at more than 800 polling places. More than 1 million registered voters in the county had yet to vote. After Hanen's decision, he kept the Toyota Center arena site open, since it comported with existing law. Regarding election day voting, as a result of the court rejecting the claim, "They will have the same access to the polls that their neighbors have had." "…We're proud to be upholding democracy at a time when it is under attack." He noted the case was the latest in nearly a dozen lawsuits brought by Texas Republicans to block expanded voter access. In November, Republican Governor Greg Abbott limited every county to a single drop site for mailed votes. That forced the county to have to close eleven other sites and caused some voters to need to drive many hours to drop their ballots off. Republicans also had successfully sued to stop Harris County from mailing ballots to every eligible voter in lieu of requests for such ballots. Hanen's decision was appealed by Republicans to the Fifth Circuit Court of Appeals. At stake in the legal contest over drive-through voting sites were almost 9% of all the votes cast in the third-most populous county in the U.S. The effort by Hollins that re-opened drive-through voting sites this year was intended to address safety issues resulting from the pandemic. Republicans who sued argued drive-through voting was offered illegally and strategically in areas with Democratic majorities. Curbside voting in Harris County previously had been limited to disabled voters, and drive-through voting in 2020 was unrestricted. Retiree Peter Nasser, had been protesting outside the courthouse "to protect my vote," saying Republicans were "scared to death of losing Texas." On October 13, Houston Attorney David Hobbs and his wife had voted in the drive-through and had joined the suit as plaintiffs. "Votes should be protected. That's what a democracy is," Hobbs said.

Legal offices
Preceded by Filemon Vela Sr.	Judge of the United States District Court for the Southern District of Texas; 2002–2025	Succeeded by Richard W. Bennett
