= Deferred Action for Childhood Arrivals =

United States immigration policy that protects certain undocumented immigrants

A Form I-797 Notice of Action issued by United States Citizenship and Immigration Services indicating that the addressee has been granted deferred action under the DACA program

Deferred Action for Childhood Arrivals (DACA) is a United States immigration policy that allows some individuals who, on June 15, 2012, were physically present in the United States with no lawful immigration status after having entered the country as children at least five years earlier, to receive a renewable two-year period of deferred action from deportation and to be eligible for an employment authorization document (work permit). By 2026, there were approximately 500,000 people with DACA status.

DACA was implemented by the Barack Obama administration after the failure of Congress to pass the DREAM Act, bipartisan legislation to grant temporary conditional residency, with the right to work, to qualified applicants following illegal immigration to the United States as minors—and, if they later satisfy further qualifications, they would attain permanent residency. The DREAM Act had majority support in Congress but could not overcome a filibuster by the Republican Party in the Senate.

In American politics, the Democratic Party supports protection of DACA recipients and a pathway to citizenship for these individuals, whereas the Republican Party seeks to repeal DACA and deport the recipients. Enacted by the Barack Obama administration, DACA was rescinded by the first Trump administration, restored by the Joe Biden administration, and rescinded again by the second Trump administration which detained and deported DACA recipients.

== Background ==
=== Origin ===
The DREAM Act bill, which would have provided a pathway to permanent residency for undocumented immigrants brought to the United States upon meeting certain qualifications, was considered by Congress in 2007. It failed to overcome a bipartisan filibuster in the Senate. It was considered again in 2011. The bill passed the House, but did not get the 60 votes needed to overcome a Republican filibuster in the Senate. In 2013, legislation had comprehensively reformed the immigration system, including allowing Dreamers permission to stay in the country, work and attend school; this passed the Senate but was not brought up for a vote in the House. The New York Times credits the failure of Congress to pass the DREAM Act bill as the driver behind Obama's decision to sign DACA.

The policy was created after acknowledgment that "Dreamer" young people had been largely raised in the United States, and this was seen as a way to remove immigration enforcement attention from "low priority" individuals with good behavior. "Dreamers" get their name from the DREAM Act, a bill that aimed to grant legal status to young immigrants residing in the U.S. unlawfully after being brought in by their parents. The undocumented immigrant young population was rapidly increasing; approximately 65,000 undocumented immigrant students graduate from U.S. high schools on a yearly basis. The vast majority of Dreamers are from Mexico.

To be eligible for the program, recipients cannot have felonies or serious misdemeanors on their records. Unlike the proposed DREAM Act, DACA does not provide a path to citizenship for recipients. The policy, an executive branch memorandum, was announced by President Barack Obama on June 15, 2012. This followed a campaign by immigrants, advocates and supporters which employed a range of tactics. President Obama explained the limits of DACA, "Let's be clear – this is not amnesty, this is not immunity. This is not a path to citizenship." A senior government official said, "Deferred action is not a pathway to citizenship. It is not legal status. It simply says that for three years, you are not a law enforcement priority and are not going to go after you... It is temporary and it is revocable."

U.S. Citizenship and Immigration Services (USCIS) began accepting applications for the program on August 15, 2012.

=== Demographics ===
DACA recipients come to the United States from all over the world, over 100 different countries, however, a majority were born in Mexico, about 80%. According to the American Immigration Council, there have been roughly 834,877 DACA recipients since 2012. The three countries of origin with the largest amount of DACA recipients are Mexico, with about 428,340, followed by El Salvador (20,770), and Guatemala (13,970). Once in the United States, the most common states of residence for DACA recipients are California (149,460) and Texas (88,250), though significant numbers were also found in New York (21,210) and Florida (20,800).

=== Effects ===
Research has shown that DACA increased the wages and employment status of DACA-eligible immigrants, and improved the mental health outcomes for DACA participants and their children. Research also suggests it reduced the number of undocumented immigrant households living in poverty. There is no evidence to indicate that DACA recipients have higher crime rates than native-born Americans; most research shows that immigrants have lower crime rates than native-born Americans. Economists reject that DACA has adverse effects on the U.S. economy or that it adversely affects the labor market outcomes of native-born Americans. In August 2018, USCIS estimated there were 699,350 active DACA recipients residing in the United States. Immigration researchers estimate the population to be between 690,000 and 800,000 people. Another estimate is "approximately 636,390 DACA recipients as of December 31, 2020".

=== Establishment ===
President Barack Obama announced the policy at the White House on June 15, 2012, the 30th anniversary of Plyler v. Doe, a Supreme Court decision barring public schools from charging undocumented immigrant children tuition. The policy was officially established by a memorandum from the Secretary of Homeland Security titled "Exercising Prosecutorial Discretion with Respect to Individuals Who Came to the United States as Children". This policy allowed certain immigrants to escape deportation and obtain work permits for a period of two years—renewable upon good behavior. To apply, immigrants had to be younger than 31 on June 15, 2012, must have come to the U.S. when they were younger than 16, and must have lived in the U.S. since 2007. In August 2012, the Pew Research Center estimated that up to 1.7 million people were eligible.

United States Citizenship and Immigration Services (USCIS) began accepting applications for the program on August 15, 2012. As of June 2016, USCIS had received 844,931 initial applications for DACA status, of which 741,546 (88%) were approved, 60,269 (7%) were denied, and 43,121 (5%) were pending. Over half of those accepted reside in California and Texas. According to an August 2017 survey, most current registrants (called "Dreamers" in a reference to the DREAM Act bill) are in their 20s, and about 80% arrived in the United States when they were 10 or younger.

In November 2014, Obama announced his intention to expand DACA to make more people eligible. However, in December 2014, Texas and 25 other states, all with Republican governors, sued the U.S. District Court for the Southern District of Texas asking the court to enjoin implementation of both the DACA expansion and Deferred Action for Parents of Americans (DAPA) (a similar program). In February 2015, Judge Andrew S. Hanen issued a preliminary injunction blocking the expansion from going into effect while the case, Texas v. United States, proceeded. After progressing through the court system, an equally divided (4–4) Supreme Court left the injunction in place, without setting any precedent.

=== Reaction ===
Republican Party leaders denounced the DACA program as an abuse of executive power.

Nearly all Republicans in the House of Representatives (along with three Democrats) voted 224–201 to defund DACA in June 2013. Lead author of the amendment Rep. Steve King (R-Iowa) stated, "The point here is ... the President does not have the authority to waive immigration law, nor does he have the authority to create it out of thin air, and he's done both with these Morton memos in this respect."

=== Regulatory history ===
In November 2014, President Obama announced his intention to expand DACA to cover additional undocumented immigrants. Multiple states immediately sued to prevent the expansion, which was blocked June 23, 2016 by an evenly divided U.S. Supreme Court in United States v. Texas.

Under President Donald Trump, the U.S. Department of Homeland Security rescinded the expansion in June 2017, while it continued to review the existence of DACA as a whole. In September 2017, the Trump administration announced a plan to phase out DACA, triggering multiple lawsuits challenging this action. The government deferred implementation of this plan for six months to allow Congress time to pass the DREAM Act or some other legislative protection for undocumented immigrants. Congress failed to act and the time extension expired on March 5, 2018, but three separate U.S. district courts ordered an injunction preventing the phase-out of the DACA by this date, on the likelihood that the rescinding was arbitrary and capricious under the Administrative Procedure Act (APA). Separately, on August 31, 2018, district court judge Andrew Hanen of the Southern District of Texas ruled that DACA is likely unconstitutional, but he let the program remain in place as litigation proceeded. The Supreme Court, ruling on June 18, 2020, on the three injunctions blocking the rescission of the DACA, affirmed that the reasoning given for the rescission was arbitrary and capricious under the APA, but did not rule on the merits of the DACA itself nor prevent the government from issuing a new rescission with better rationale.

On January 20, 2021, President Joe Biden issued an executive order reinstating DACA. On July 16, 2021, Andrew Hanen ruled that the program was "created in violation of the law" and "illegally implemented." He barred the government from accepting new applications to the program, effectively cancelling Biden's executive order. However, the ruling allows for immigrants currently protected by the program to keep their status and allow DACA renewals while the case goes through the appeals process. An appellate court in October 2022 affirmed that DACA is "unlawful". The case was then returned to the same federal district court judge to consider whether a formal set of regulatory amendments promulgated by the Biden administration to codify DACA into federal regulations on October 31, 2022 made the program lawful.

On September 13, 2023, Hanen ruled that the codified form of DACA violated federal law. However, he "maintained the status quo" for current DACA recipients by "preserv[ing] the stay", and specifically noted in the ruling and in a supplemental order that he was not ordering any deportation or other immigration or criminal action against any DACA recipient. The decision has been appealed to the Fifth Circuit and may eventually be heard by the Supreme Court.

== Implementation ==
DACA approved requests by state (Note: As of March 31, 2017.)
California	424,995
Texas	234,350
New York	95,663
Illinois	79,415
Florida	74,321
Arizona	51,503

DACA was formally initiated by a policy memorandum sent from Secretary of Homeland Security Janet Napolitano to the heads of U.S. Customs and Border Protection (CBP), U.S. Citizenship and Immigration Services (USCIS), and U.S. Immigration and Customs Enforcement (ICE). The memo formally directed them to exercise their enforcement discretion on behalf of individuals who met the requirements.

To apply for DACA, eligible individuals must pay a $495 application fee, submit several forms, and produce documents showing they meet the requirements. They do not need legal representation.

The program does not currently provide permanent lawful status or a path to citizenship, nor does it provide eligibility for federal welfare or student aid. "DACA is not a permanent legal status but rather an exercise of prosecutorial discretion". Thus, people who are beneficiaries of DACA can legally be removed from the country when the federal government chooses to deport such individuals.

=== Eligibility ===
To qualify for DACA, applicants must meet the following major requirements, although meeting them does not guarantee approval:

- Have unlawful presence in United States after entering the country before their 16th birthday
- Have lived continuously in the United States since June 15, 2007
- Were under age 31 on as of June 15, 2012 (born on June 16, 1981, or after)
- Were physically present in the United States on June 15, 2012, and at the time of making their request for consideration of deferred action with USCIS
- Had no lawful status on June 15, 2012
- Have completed high school or a GED, have been honorably discharged from the armed forces, or are enrolled in school
- Have not been convicted of a felony or serious misdemeanors, or three or more other misdemeanors, and do not otherwise pose a threat to national security or public safety

To show proof of qualification (verify these requirements), applicants must submit three forms; I-821D, Consideration of Deferred Action for Childhood Arrivals; I-765, Application for Employment Authorization; and I-765WS Worksheet, as well as supporting documentation.

In August 2012, the Migration Policy Institute estimated that as many as 1.76 million people could be eligible for DACA. Of those, 28% were under 15 and would have to wait until reaching that age to apply. In addition, roughly 20% did not meet any of the education criteria, but could become eligible by enrolling in a program before submitting their application. 74% of the eligible population was born in Mexico or Central America. Smaller proportions came from Caribbean and South America (11%), Asia (9%), and the rest of the world (6%).

In 2023, one scholar distinguished between two generations of child migrants: "First-wave DREAMers," who were the first advocates and recipients of DACA, and "second-wave DREAMers" who are more recent migrants. To be eligible, a child migrant must have been physically present in the United States on June 15, 2012 and must have continuously lived in the United States since 2007. More recent child migrants do not meet these criteria, since they would not have been born yet. As a result, there are about 246,000 undocumented college students who are not eligible for DACA and only about 181,000 who are eligible. With fewer child migrants being eligible for DACA, many futures remain uncertain. This highlights the need to establish new requirements for DACA eligibility.

The current presidential administration has openly opposed revisiting DACA and updating eligibility requirements. When President Obama established it, he described it as a temporary measure to relieve young undocumented people. This temporary measure was intended to pave the way for a long-term legislative solution. As the eligibility requirements have remained the same, DACA itself has also not evolved from a short-term measure to a long-term solution.

=== Travel eligibility ===
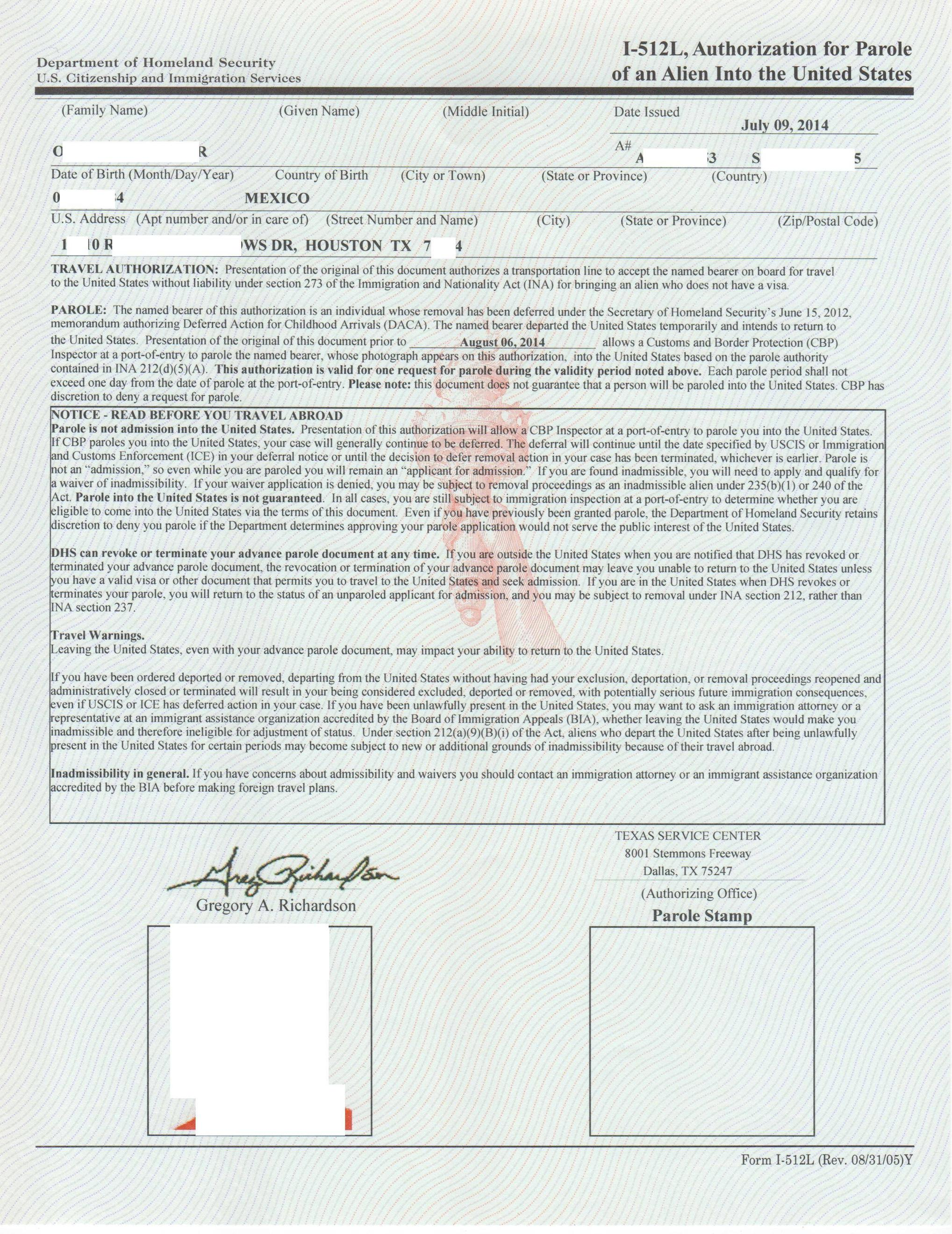
A Form I-512L issued by USCIS in 2014, permitting a U.S. Customs and Border Protection officer to allow the named DACA recipient to enter the United States under the parole authority in the Immigration and Nationality Act.

Until September 5, 2017, DACA recipients who wished to travel outside the United States could apply to do so by submitting a request for Advance Parole and paying an additional fee.

If approved, the DACA recipient could travel outside the United States and re-enter the United States with a grant of parole, making that individual potentially eligible for adjustment of status to Lawful Permanent Resident after marrying a United States citizen.

The application submitted to request Advance Parole was Form I-131 Application Type D*, with a fee of $575.

Advance Parole could be requested for travel abroad for:

- Educational purposes, such as studying abroad;
- Employment purposes, such as overseas positions, interviews, training, or meetings with clients; or
- Humanitarian purposes, such as travel for medical reasons, attend funeral services for a family member, or visit a sick relative.

Travel for leisure is not a valid purpose.

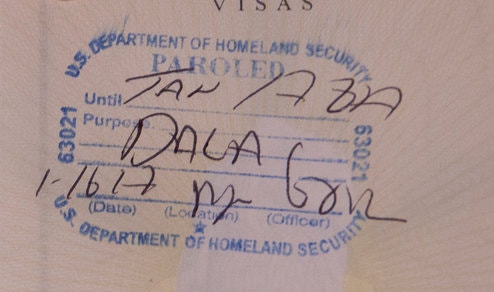
A stamp applied to the Mexican passport of a DACA recipient entering the United States with Advance Parole at John F. Kennedy International Airport in January 2017, with handwritten annotations indicating the passport holder was paroled into the United States by a Customs and Border Protection officer.

As of September 2017, USCIS ceased approving applications for an advance parole document relating to DACA. As of July 2022, however, advance parole for DACA recipients was reinstated.

=== Renewals ===
USCIS released the process for DACA renewals in June 2014 and directed applicants to file their documents during a 30-day window starting 150 days before the expiration of their previous DACA status. Renewing requires an additional $495 fee. However, the fee has increased over time and has reached $605 if filing on paper and $555 if filing online.

As of June 2016, there had been 606,264 renewal cases, with 526,288 approved, 4,703 denied and 75,205 renewals pending.

=== Expansion ===
In November 2014, U.S. President Barack Obama announced changes to DACA which would expand it to include undocumented immigrants who entered the country prior to 2010, eliminate the requirement that applicants be younger than 31 years old, and lengthen the renewable deferral period to two years. The Pew Research Center estimated that this would increase the number of eligible people by about 330,000; in December 2014, Texas and 25 other states, all with Republican governors, sued in the District Court for the Southern District of Texas asking the court to enjoin implementation of both the DACA expansion and Deferred Action for Parents of Americans (DAPA) (a similar program). In February 2015, Judge Andrew S. Hanen issued a preliminary injunction blocking the expansion from going into effect while the case, Texas v. United States, proceeded. After progressing through the court system, the appeals court ruled 2–1 in favor of enjoining the DACA expansion. When the Obama administration appealed to the Supreme Court, Justice Antonin Scalia's untimely death left an 8 justice court, which then ruled equally divided (4–4) for and against the injunction. Procedural rules of the Court in the case of a tie would mean that no opinion would be written, no precedent would be set by the Supreme Court in the case, and that the appellate court's ruling would stand.

There are now calls to expand DACA to include children of adults who entered the USA legally. In these cases, their children are only legal in the US as long as they are minors. When the children become 21 years old, they no longer have a legal visa status in the USA. Some have coined the label "documented dreamers" to describe this category of young people who entered the country with proper documentation. Another category of young people often overlooked in the discussion of DACA is those who have arrived in the USA illegally since 2010, the cutoff for the present DACA policy.

== Impact ==
Research has shown that DACA increased the wages and labor force participation of DACA-eligible immigrants and reduced the number of undocumented immigrant households living in poverty. Studies have also shown that DACA increased the mental health outcomes for DACA-eligible immigrants and their children. There are no known major adverse impacts from DACA on native-born workers' employment, and most economists say that DACA benefits the U.S. economy.

=== Crime ===
According to FactCheck.org, "there is no evidence that DACA holders are more likely to commit crimes than U.S. citizens." FactCheck.org noted that "numerous studies have found that immigrants do not commit crimes at a higher rate than non-immigrants."

=== Economy ===
Fact-checkers note that, on a large scale or in the long run, there is no reason to believe that DACA recipients have a major deleterious effect on American workers' employment chances; to the contrary, some economists say that DACA benefits the overall U.S. economy. Economists have warned that ending DACA could adversely affect the U.S. economy, and that "most economists see immigration generally as an economic boon." Almost all economists reject Jeff Sessions' claim that DACA "denied jobs to hundreds of thousands of Americans by allowing those same jobs to go to illegal aliens." Sessions' claim is rooted in what economists call the "lump of labor fallacy" (i.e., the idea that there is a limit to demand for labor in any economy).

A 2016 study in the Journal of Public Economics found that DACA increased labor force participation and decreased the unemployment rate for DACA-eligible immigrants. DACA also increased the income of undocumented immigrants in the bottom of the income distribution. The study estimates that DACA moved 50,000 to 75,000 unauthorized immigrants into employment. According to University of California, Davis economist Giovanni Peri, DACA consequently "increases consumption and overall demand for U.S. services, products, and jobs where the DACA recipients live and spend. Economists have shown that highly skilled workers increase local productivity and create opportunities for the other workers too". A 2016 study in Economics Letters found that DACA-eligible households were 38% less likely than non-eligible unauthorized immigrant households to live in poverty. Furthermore, DACA-eligible workers tend to have higher-skilled, higher-paying jobs than undocumented immigrants.

According to one survey, 91 percent of DACA registrants are employed, and 5 percent have launched their own businesses, compared to 3.1 percent of all Americans. According to Giovanni Peri, ending DACA would bring a net loss in productivity, given that, as of 2017, the U.S. economy is close to full employment. Ike Brannon and Logan Albright of the Cato Institute wrote in 2017 that ending DACA would have an adverse economic and fiscal impact, estimating that the cost of immediately eliminating DACA and deporting those who received deferred action would be $283 billion over a decade (representing an economic loss of $215 billion, a fiscal loss of $60 billion (from lower net tax revenue), and $7.5 billion in deportation costs). Brannon and Albright wrote that their projections were "a conservative estimate due to the fact that many DACA immigrants are young and still acquiring education credentials that will boost wages later." The Immigrant Legal Resource Center estimated that deporting DACA-eligible individuals would reduce Social Security and Medicare tax revenue by $24.6 billion over a decade. Peri argues that DACA recipients likely have a significant net positive fiscal impact given that DACA-eligible individuals have similar characteristics as second-generation immigrants, and that research shows that second-generation immigrants have a net positive fiscal impact of $173,000 to $259,000 per immigrant. Peri also notes that the U.S. public school system has already invested in educating these individuals, and they are at the point at which they can start contributing to the U.S. economy and public coffers; deporting them or increasing the likelihood that they will be deported is economically counterproductive. A 2017 study by the Center for American Progress estimated that the loss of all DACA-eligible workers would reduce U.S. GDP by $433 billion over the next 10 years. This would mean an average reduction in GDP of $43.3 billion per year from 2017 to 2027, or 0.2% of the 2018 U.S. GDP of $20 trillion.

According to Federal Reserve Bank of Dallas economist Pia Orrenius, due to their risk of deportation, it is likely that previously DACA-protected individuals would slip into the shadow economy or take low-profile jobs that pay less.

A 2018 National Bureau of Economic Research paper found that DACA likely led to greater productivity by increasing the college attendance and employment of DACA-eligible individuals.

=== Education ===
Research has shown mixed findings for DACA on education outcomes. A 2016 study in the Journal of Public Economics found that DACA had no significant effect on the likelihood of attending school. The study only found "suggestive evidence that DACA pushed over 25,000 DACA-eligible individuals into obtaining their GED certificate in order to be eligible for DACA." However, research by Roberto G. Gonzales, professor of education at Harvard University, showed that DACA led to increased educational attainment. A 2018 National Bureau of Economic Research paper found that DACA led to greater high school attainment and college attendance for DACA-eligible individuals.

A 2016 study in the Journal of Population Economics found that DACA "reduced the probability of school enrollment of eligible higher-educated individuals, as well as some evidence that it increased the employment likelihood of men, in particular. Together, these findings suggest that a lack of authorization may lead individuals to enroll in school when working is not a viable option."

The effects of the rescinding and subsequent reimplementation of DACA has affected college students dramatically. The primary effects are psychological and educational in nature. The first way it does so is the general stress that comes with having an uncertain legal status: 70.9% of DACA recipients strongly agreed with the statement "they worry about the future of the program". Many recipients have spoken about how their DACA status gives them anxiety because of fear for the unknown. This can then affect their education because individuals take that uncertainty and apply it to how much effort they should be putting into their schoolwork. The possible threat of deportation at any moment causes many DACA students reduce the amount of time they spend doing coursework, and some even drop out in favor of earning money at a job. A 2018 study showed the compound effect of being at a four-year university vs. a community college with 7.3% increase in dropout rates. Not only does this status make individuals less likely to finish their undergraduate degree, but it can also stop students from pursuing a graduate degree, especially in terms of funding.

The psychological effects of this status also becomes a barrier for DACA students in their college experience, largely because of the uncertainty that the status carries. Many reported high rates of extreme stress and anxiety as compared to their documented counterparts. Also, the internalizing of the label "illegal" made it so that these individuals saw themselves as less human. In certain cases this meant more instances of self-harm and even suicide in some cases.

=== Health and well-being ===
A 2017 study published in the journal Science found that DACA led to improved mental health outcomes for the children of DACA-eligible mothers. A 2017 Lancet Public Health study found that DACA-eligible individuals had better mental health outcomes as a result of their DACA eligibility. A cross-sectional study published in 2018 in the journal Social Science & Medicine determined that receiving deferred action improved the psychological well-being of DACA recipient, as measured by declines in levels of distress, negative emotions, and fear of deportation. A study published in 2017 in the journal Social Problems reported findings from a series of in-depth interviews with 53 undocumented young adults in Florida (of whom 42 obtained DACA), who had been brought to the United States at an average age of eight. The study found that undocumented youth in the United States suffered from a lack of ontological security, and that negative emotions (such as frustration) were more pronounced among youth who do not have DACA status than among those who did receive DACA status. The interviews demonstrated that DACA recipients received relief from immediate fear of deportation, but continued to suffer "anxiety and insecurity ... because they have parents and other kin who are still subject to deportation." The study authors concluded that "Programs such as DACA are important, but only long-term immigration reform that allows full incorporation and citizenship and protects all members of a family will enable young adults to find their place in this country and come to develop trust in U.S. social institutions and their representatives."

FiveThirtyEight, summarizing the findings of past research, wrote that "the threat of deportation alone would likely have a negative impact on families. Immigration-related stress and anxiety have been shown to have negative health effects... Generally, researchers believe the stress that stems from the fear of having a parent deported has far-reaching, negative effects on the health of children." In an editorial for the New England Journal of Medicine, Atheendar S. Venkataramani, professor of medicine at the University of Pennsylvania, and Alexander C. Tsai, professor of psychiatry at Harvard Medical School, wrote, "The evidence clearly indicates that rescinding DACA will have profound adverse population-level effects on mental health... DACA was never intended to be a public health program, but its population-level consequences for mental health have been significant and rival those of any large-scale health or social policies in recent history. Rescinding DACA therefore represents a threat to public mental health." A study that was published 2019 showed an improvement of self-reported health for Latina/o DACA-eligible immigrants and their children from 2012 to 2015 and a worsening after 2015.

21 percent of DACA-protected immigrants work in education and health services. The American Medical Association has estimated that under DACA or similar legislation, 5,400 additional physicians would work in the United States in coming decades, alleviating a projected shortage of primary care physicians.

=== Migration flows ===
A 2016 study published in the journal International Migration found that DACA did not significantly impact the number of apprehensions of unaccompanied minors from Central America. A 2015 Government Accountability Office (GAO) report assessing the reasons behind the surge in unaccompanied minors from Central America did not mention DACA, and cited crime and lack of economic opportunity as the main reasons behind the surge.

=== Notable recipients ===
- Bambadjan Bamba, Ivorian actor
- David Dobrik, Slovak-American YouTuber
- Karla Cornejo Villavicencio, undocumented immigrant from Ecuador and author of The Undocumented Americans.
- Xunami Muse, Panamanian drag performer.

== Legal challenges to DACA ==
The legality of DACA and its proposed expansions were challenged in court based on a 2014 Fifth Circuit decision that had upheld a similar challenge to the related Deferred Action for Parents of Americans (DAPA). But only the expansions were halted under a preliminary injunction. Legal experts are divided as to the constitutionality of DACA and one district court has ruled it to be likely illegal.

One of the challenges against DACA was filed in August 2012 by ten agents from the U.S. Immigration and Customs Enforcement (ICE). The plaintiffs claimed that following the new lenient deportation policies established by DACA required them to violate the law. Almost a year later, Judge Reed O'Connor from the U.S. District Court for the Northern District of Texas dismissed the lawsuit, ruling that the court lacked jurisdiction to decide on what essentially was a dispute between federal employees and their employer, the U.S. government. Nonetheless, in his decision to dismiss the case, O'Connor reiterated his view that DACA was inherently unlawful. The plaintiffs then filed an appeal but the U.S. Court of Appeals for the Fifth Circuit upheld the dismissal on procedural grounds.

The first challenge against the DACA expansions was filed by Sheriff Joe Arpaio of Maricopa County, Arizona, in November 2014. In the lawsuit, Arpaio claimed that DACA and its expansions were "unconstitutional, arbitrary and capricious, and invalid under the Administrative Procedure Act as, in effect, regulations that have been promulgated without the requisite opportunity for public notice and comment." The U.S. District Court for the District of Columbia promptly dismissed the lawsuit ruling that Arpaio did not have standing. That decision was upheld unanimously by the U.S. Court of Appeals for the District of Columbia Circuit on August 14, 2015. Arpaio then asked the U.S. Supreme Court to review the case, but on January 19, 2016, the court denied that request.

The challenge that was granted a preliminary injunction was filed in December 2014 by Texas and 25 other states—all with Republican governors. The group of states sued to enjoin the implementation of the DAPA—another immigration policy—and the DACA expansions announced by the Obama administration. In the lawsuit, the states claimed that, by expanding DACA, the president failed to enforce the nation's immigration laws in contravention to Article Two of the U.S. Constitution. (Note: Texas v. United States (2016) "The Court has federal question jurisdiction under 28 U.S.C. § 1331 because this action arises under the U.S. Constitution, art. II, § 3, cl. 5 [.]") Moreover, the states claimed that the president unilaterally rewrote the law through his actions. As part of the judicial process, in February 2015, Judge Andrew S. Hanen issued a preliminary injunction blocking the expansion from going into effect while the case, Texas v. United States, proceeded. After progressing through the court system, an equally divided (4–4) Supreme Court left the injunction in place, without setting any precedent. The court's temporary injunction did not affect the existing DACA. At the time, individuals were allowed to continue to come forward and request an initial grant of DACA or renewal of DACA under the guidelines established in 2012.

Regardless of the outcome of the preliminary injunction, legal opinions on the lawfulness of DACA are divided. In United States v. Texas, for instance, the Obama administration argued that the policy was a lawful exercise of the enforcement discretion that Congress delegated to the executive branch in the Immigration and Nationality Act, which charges the executive with the administration and enforcement of the country's immigration laws. Conversely, Jay Sekulow, Chief Counsel of the American Center for Law and Justice, opined that DACA was unlawful by asserting that it unconstitutionally usurped Congress' role over immigration by illegally allowing certain classes of illegal aliens to violate U.S. immigration law with impunity.

On November 17, 2016, in the waning days of the Obama Administration, a group of lawmakers sent a letter to President Obama urging him to exercise his Constitutional authority to pardon the DREAMers of their immigration violations - entering the country illegally or overstaying a visa - to protect them from deportation.

On May 1, 2018, a coalition of seven states, led by Texas, filed a lawsuit challenging the constitutionality of the program, after originally promising to challenge the program if the administration didn't rescind it. On August 31, 2018, District Court Judge Andrew Hanen ruled that DACA is likely unconstitutional, however he let the program remain in place as litigation proceeds. On November 22, 2019, in light of the Trump administration's rescission of DACA and the Supreme Court cases challenging it, the court stayed the case until after the Supreme Court issues its ruling. After the Supreme Court issued its ruling invalidating the rescission of DACA on APA grounds, judge Hanen resumed the case. In July 2020 Chad Wolf signed a memo outlining rules which limited applications and renewals for DACA while he was illegally serving as acting Homeland Security secretary, therefore invalidating those rules, according to a judgment made in November 2020 by Judge Nicholas Garaufis of the United States District Court for the Eastern District of New York. Judge Garaufis ruled later in December 2020 that the Trump administration must begin accepting applications to the DACA programs and implement as it was handled under the Obama administration, essentially, a full restoration.

On January 20, 2021, President Joe Biden issued an executive order reinstating DACA. On July 16, 2021, federal judge Andrew Hanen ruled that the program was "created in violation of the law" and "illegally implemented." He barred the government from accepting new applications to the program, effectively cancelling Biden's executive order. However, the ruling allows for immigrants currently protected by the program to keep their status and allow DACA renewals while the case goes through the appeals process.

== State and city responses ==
State-level government officials are also divided on the issue. Those that support DACA claim that the government does not have the resources to target all undocumented immigrants and that the policy thus helps federal agencies in exerting prosecutorial discretion—that is, in enforcing the law selectively by focusing limited resources on criminal immigrants rather than on non-criminal ones such as those eligible for DACA. Those that oppose the policy, however, claim that states would be forced to spend hundreds of millions of dollars on health care, education, law enforcement, and other public benefits associated with the immigrants receiving relief. For instance, DACA opponents claim that Texas could assume up to $500 million in administrative costs for issuing new driver's licenses.

=== Arizona ===
Arizona became the first state to oppose President Obama's order for DACA when Governor Jan Brewer issued an order blocking those with deferred status from receiving any state benefits. This caused controversy, as eligible and approved applicants would still be unable to obtain a driver's license. In May 2013, a federal district court held that this policy was likely unconstitutional. In 2014, the U.S. Court of Appeals for the Ninth Circuit issued a preliminary injunction against Brewer's ban, and in November 2014 held this ban was in violation of the law.

=== California ===
To assist those eligible under the program, the state of California has agreed to support those who receive a DACA grant by allowing access to a state driver's license, provided that such individuals participate in specific state guidelines (such as paying income taxes). The state of California also allows DACA holding individuals to qualify for Medi-Cal.

=== Illinois ===
Mayor of Chicago Rahm Emanuel stated that he wants to make Chicago the "most immigrant-friendly city in the country". In addition to offering in-state tuition for undocumented immigrants, he has also made plans for a city ordinance that would prevent undocumented immigrants with no criminal background from being turned over to immigration enforcement agencies.

=== Iowa ===
In 2012, the then-director of the Iowa Department of Transportation, Paul Trombino III, announced a policy to deny driver's licenses to Iowa residents who were part of the DACA program. The policy was reversed several weeks later.

=== Maryland ===
In 2016, Mayor of Baltimore (2010–2016) Stephanie Rawlings-Blake stated that Baltimore police would not check the citizenship status of people with whom they interact.

Maryland residents are eligible for in-state public tuition rates regardless of immigration status under certain conditions. A Maryland resident is eligible if they attended Maryland high schools for at least three of the previous twelve years and they graduated from a Maryland high school or received a Maryland GED within the previous ten years. They must have registered at a Maryland public college within four years of high school graduation or receiving a Maryland GED. They must have registered for Selective Service if male, and they must have filed Maryland income tax returns.

=== Michigan ===
In October 2012, the Michigan Secretary of State, Ruth Johnson, announced that Michigan would not issue driver's licenses or state identification of any kind to beneficiaries of Deferred Action for Childhood Arrivals. In making this decision, it was clear that the Secretary of State erroneously conflated the notion of "lawful presence," which is required under Michigan Law to issue a driver's license, and "lawful status," a different legal concept entirely. USCIS has made it clear that DACA beneficiaries do not possess legal status, but does not state that DACA beneficiaries are unlawfully present; in fact, it states that DACA beneficiaries will not accrue unlawful presence time here while they are in this deferred action status. The Secretary of State relied upon USCIS' own explanation, which discusses legal status, not lawful presence. In response to this policy, the ACLU filed a lawsuit against Johnson, alleging that the policy violated both Michigan law and the U.S. Constitution. On January 18, 2013, USCIS updated their "Frequently Asked Questions" page about DACA, clarifying, among other things, that DACA beneficiaries are, in fact, lawfully present in the United States. On February 1, 2013, Johnson reversed her policy and began issuing driver's licenses to DACA beneficiaries on February 19, 2013.

=== Nebraska ===
Governor Dave Heineman opposed Deferred Action for Childhood Arrivals and in 2012 directed the Nebraska Department of Motor Vehicles to not issue driver's licenses to people who received deferred action under DACA. Heineman said that providing any benefit, including a driver's license, to an illegal immigrant would be a violation of Nebraska state law.

In 2015, however, the Nebraska Legislature determined that Section 202(c)(B)(viii) of the REAL ID Act of 2005 required states to allow people to present documentation of deferred-action status when registering for a driver's license, and the Nebraska Legislature voted to change state law to allow qualified individuals with DACA to receive licenses by using documentation of their status of deferred action. Governor Pete Ricketts vetoed the bill; the legislature voted 34–10 to override the veto. Nebraska became the last of the 50 states to allow deferred-action recipients to obtain licenses.

=== North Carolina ===
North Carolina briefly suspended giving driver's licenses to DACA grantees while awaiting the state attorney general's opinion. The attorney general decided that even without formal immigration status, DACA grantees were to be granted legal presence. Subsequently, the state once again continued to give driver's licenses and allowed DACA grantees to become legal residents of North Carolina.

=== Texas ===
Although in-state tuition was still offered, Governor Rick Perry announced his opposition to DACA by distributing a letter to all state agencies, meant "to ensure that all Texas agencies understand that Secretary Napolitano's guidelines confer absolutely no legal status whatsoever to any illegal immigrant who qualifies for the federal 'deferred action' designation."

=== Virginia ===
In April 2014, Virginia Attorney General Mark Herring sent a letter to the director of the State Council of Higher Education for Virginia (SCHEV), the presidents of Virginia public colleges and universities, and the chancellor of the Virginia Community College System in response to inquiries from public institutions of higher education on whether DACA students were eligible for in-state tuition. The attorney general advised that under Virginia law, DACA students who met Virginia's domicile requirements were eligible for in-state tuition.

== Rescission by Trump (first term) ==
While running for president, Donald Trump declared he intended to repeal DACA on "day one" of his presidency.

On February 14, 2017, a CNN report on the detention of 23-year-old Daniel Ramirez Medina in Northwest Detention Center, Tacoma, Washington, following his arrest in his father's Des Moines, Washington, home, observed that "The case raises questions about what it could mean" for the 750,000 Dreamers, who had "received permission to stay under DACA." On March 7, 22-year-old Daniela Vargas of Jackson, Mississippi, another DACA recipient, was detained by ICE, further raising speculation about President Trump's commitment to Dreamers and questioning whether immigrants who speak out against the administration's policies should fear retaliation. Vargas was released from LaSalle Detention Center on March 10, and Ramirez Medina's release followed on March 29.

On June 16, 2017, the United States Department of Homeland Security announced it intended to repeal the executive order by the Barack Obama administration that expanded the DACA program, although the DACA program's overall existence would continue to be reviewed. A ban on travel outside the U.S. was instituted, reversing the ability granted under Obama's executive order.

On September 5, 2017, Attorney General Jeff Sessions announced that the program was being repealed. Sessions stated that the DACA-eligible individuals were lawbreakers who adversely impacted the wages and employment of native-born Americans. Sessions also attributed DACA as a leading cause behind the surge in unaccompanied minors coming to the United States from Central America. President Trump said that "virtually all" "top legal experts" believed that DACA was unconstitutional. Fact-checkers have said that only a few economists believe DACA adversely affects native-born workers, that there is scant evidence that DACA caused the surge in unaccompanied minors, and that it is false that all "top legal experts" believe DACA to be unconstitutional.

Sessions added that implementation would be suspended for six months; DACA status and Employment Authorization Documents ("EAD") that expired during the next six months would continue to be renewed. DACA recipients with a work permit set to expire on or before March 5, 2018, would have the opportunity to apply for a two-year renewal if their application was received by USCIS by October 5, 2017. In a follow-up statement, Trump said "It is now time for Congress to act!" The approximately 800,000 immigrants who qualified for enrollment in DACA would become eligible for deportation by the end of those six months. A White House memo stated that DACA recipients should "use the time remaining on their work authorizations to prepare for and arrange their departure from the United States."

=== Reaction ===
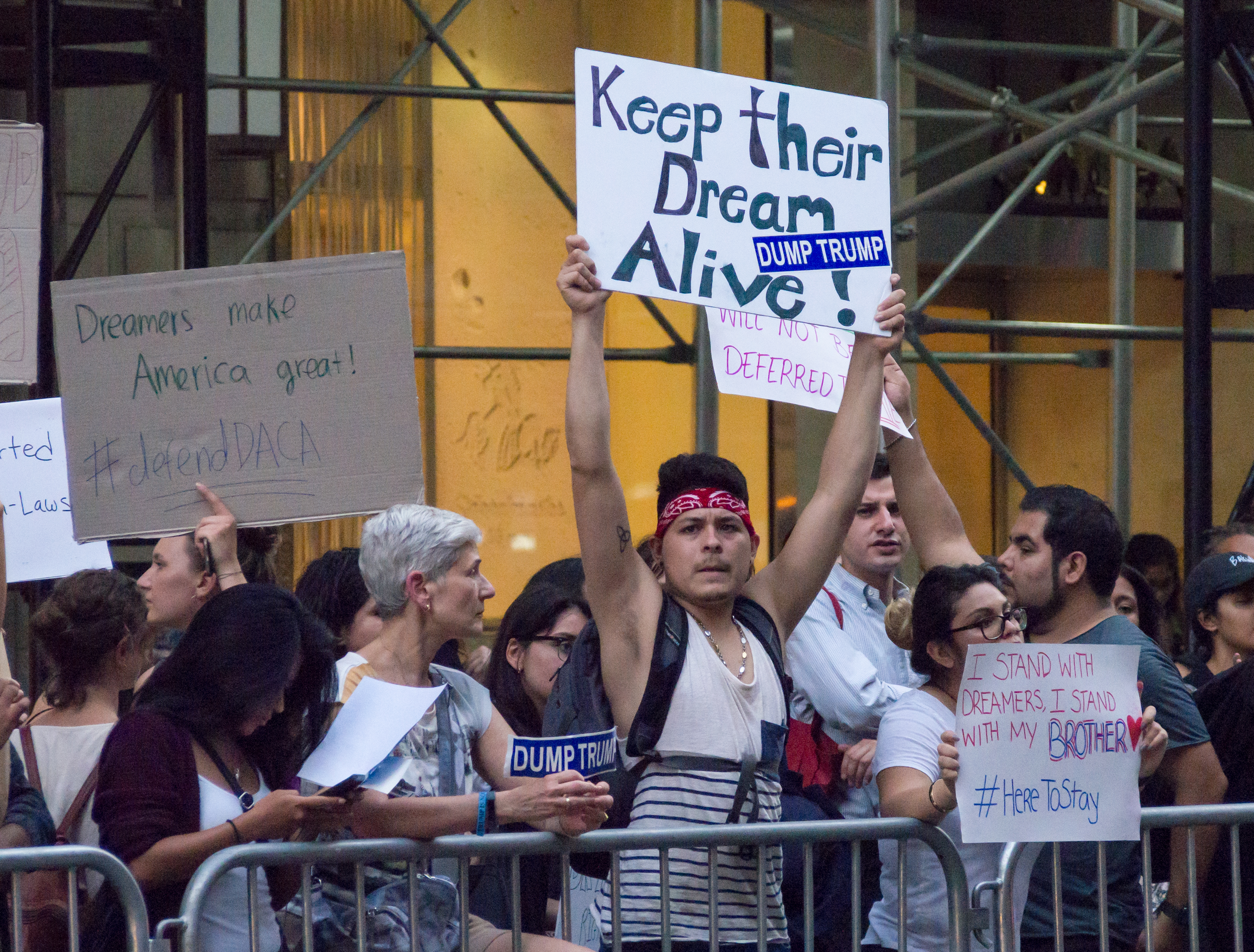
Protesters outside Trump Tower in New York City, September 5, 2017

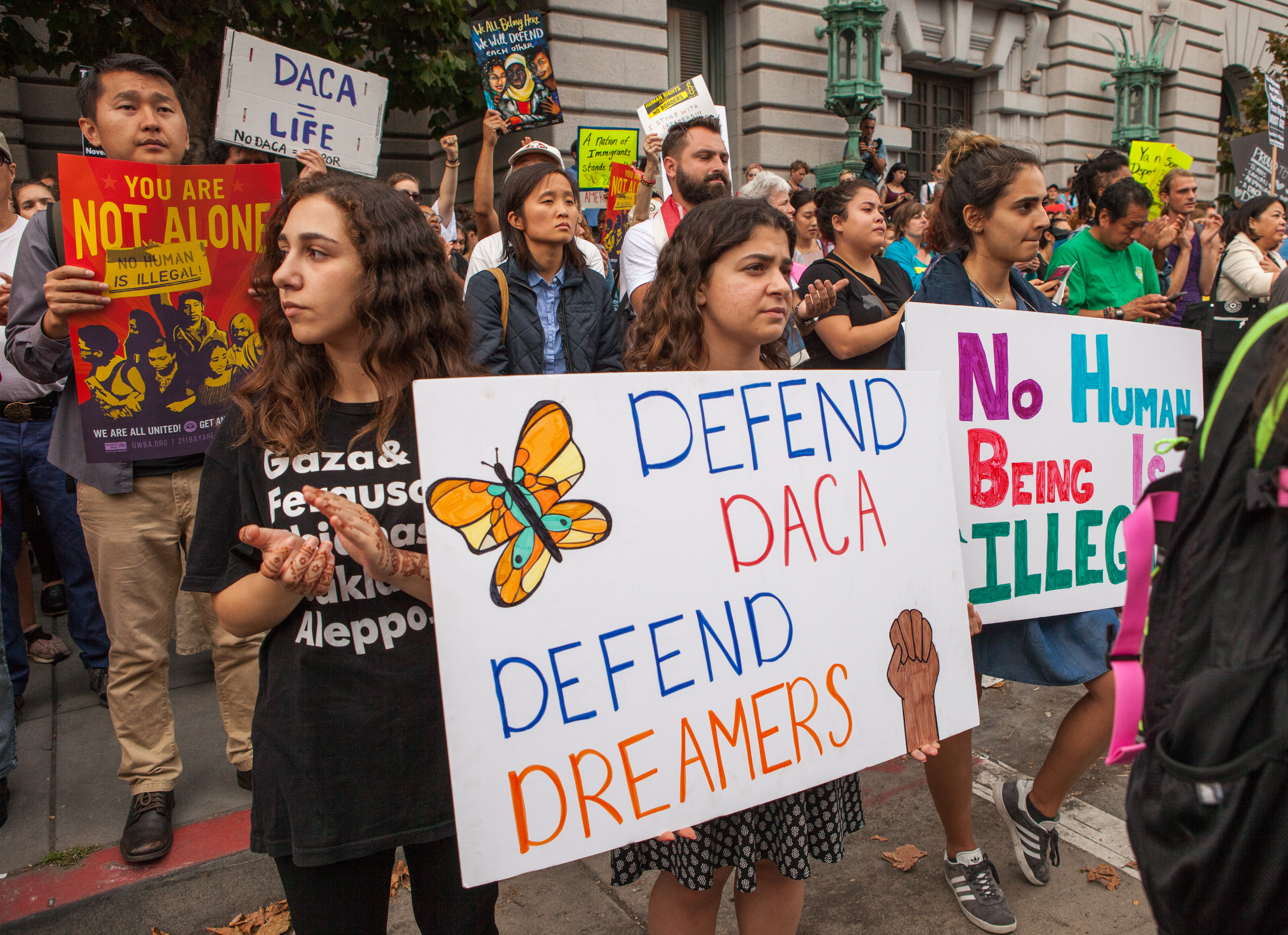
Protesters in San Francisco, September 5, 2017

According to The New York Times, "Democrats and some Republicans, business executives, college presidents and immigration activists condemned the repeal as a coldhearted and shortsighted effort that was unfair to the young immigrants and could harm the economy." Former President Obama condemned the repeal as "cruel" and wrote:

They were brought to this country by their parents, sometimes even as infants. They may not know a country besides ours. They may not even know a language besides English. They often have no idea they're undocumented until they apply for a job, or college, or a driver's license ... Whatever concerns or complaints Americans may have about immigration in general, we shouldn't threaten the future of this group of young people who are here through no fault of their own, who pose no threat, who are not taking away anything from the rest of us ... Kicking them out won't lower the unemployment rate, or lighten anyone's taxes, or raise anybody's wages.

The reaction was mixed among Republicans. Several senior Republicans praised Trump's action, such as House Speaker Paul Ryan, Senate Majority Leader Mitch McConnell and Senator Ron Johnson, chairman of the Homeland Security and Governmental Affairs Committee. Ryan said that Mr. Trump, "was right in his decision" to give Congress the time to find a compromise that could protect the 800,000 young adults brought to the United States illegally as children who qualify for the program, also known as DACA. Other Republicans, including Senators John McCain and Jeff Flake, and Representative Ileana Ros-Lehtinen, condemned the Trump Administration's choice to rescind the executive order. In a released statement Senator McCain said:

I strongly believe that children who were illegally brought into this country through no fault of their own should not be forced to return to a country they do not know. The 800,000 innocent young people granted deferred action under DACA over the last several years are pursuing degrees, starting careers, and contributing to our communities in important ways. While I disagreed with President Obama's unilateral action on this issue, I believe that rescinding DACA at this time is an unacceptable reversal of the promises and opportunities that have been conferred to these individuals.

Organizations such as the American Civil Liberties Union, Anti-Defamation League, and U.S. Chamber of Commerce condemned the repeal. A number of religious organizations condemned the repeal, with the U.S. Conference of Catholic Bishops describing it as "reprehensible". The Catholic University of Notre Dame also urged the president to not rescind DACA and announced it would stand by those affected. The United Methodist Church said it was "not only unconscionable, but contrary to moral work and witness," and the Evangelical Lutheran Church called on its members to "pray today for those that will suffer undue repercussions due to the end of this program." Asked about Trump's decision to rescind DACA, Pope Francis said if Trump is truly pro-life, "he will understand that the family is the cradle of life and that it must be defended as a unit." Ralph Reed, chairman of the Faith and Freedom Coalition, endorsed Trump's repeal.

The September 2017 announcement sparked protests in many cities including Washington, D.C., Chicago, and Los Angeles. At a September 5 protest in New York outside of Trump Tower, more than 30 protesters were arrested. On September 19, more protesters were arrested outside Trump Tower, including Democratic congressmen Raúl Grijalva of Arizona, Luis Gutiérrez of Illinois, and Adriano Espaillat of New York.

=== Proposed legislative responses to Trump's DACA rescission ===
In announcing the rescission, the Trump Administration delayed implementation for six months to allow Congress to pass the DREAM Act or otherwise settle the status of Dreamers legislatively. Multiple proposals were introduced in Congress but none passed. Proposals included:

- DREAM Act: Proposed by Sens. Graham and Durbin, the DREAM Act offers protections to illegal immigrants similar to DACA, as well as offering a path to citizenship.
- Recognizing America's Children Act: Proposed by Rep. Curbelo, RAC offers a pathway to legalization through education, military service, or work authorization. After 10 years in this program, immigrants could apply for citizenship.
- The American Hope Act: Proposed by Rep. Gutiérrez, this act offers an expedited path to citizenship that is attainable in eight years, but the immigrant must have entered the US before the age of eighteen.
- BRIDGE Act: Proposed by Rep. Coffman, this bill extends the DACA program by three years, allowing more time to discuss comprehensive immigration reform.
- Broader Options for Americans Act: This bill is used for immigration debate in the Senate.

In February 2018 the Senate considered four bills to offer legal protection to people who came to the United States undocumented as children, but all four bills failed to pass. On March 5, 2018, the rescission of DACA was supposed to become effective, leaving nearly 700,000 Dreamers eligible for deportation. A Supreme Court ruling postponed the effective date until at least October 2018. In the interim, DACA recipients remain protected and can continue to renew their protected status.

=== Legal challenges to rescission ===
The rescission was challenged in court by different entities. On September 6, 2017, fifteen states and the District of Columbia filed a lawsuit, titled New York v. Trump, in the United States District Court for the Eastern District of New York seeking to stop the rescission. A few days later, the California attorney general, Xavier Becerra, filed a separate lawsuit, which was joined by the states of Maine, Minnesota, and Maryland. Becerra stated that, as a quarter of the people in the DACA program live in California, he thinks that "everyone recognizes the scope and breadth of the Trump decision to terminate DACA hits hardest here." Not only have state governments filed suit, but also six DREAMERs have filed suit against Trump in San Francisco. The University of California, which currently has approximately 4,000 undocumented students, has also filed a lawsuit against the Department of Homeland Security which was filed in the Northern District of California. Janet Napolitano, president of the UC system, called the rescission of DACA, "unconstitutional, unjust, and unlawful". In a released statement Napolitano said:

I am deeply troubled by President Trump's decision to effectively end the DACA program and uproot the lives of an estimated 800,000 Dreamers across the nation. This backward-thinking, far-reaching move threatens to separate families and derail the futures of some of this country's brightest young minds, thousands of whom currently attend or have graduated from the University of California.

On December 20, 2017, the Supreme Court remanded five DACA cases originally filed in the Northern District of California back to the Ninth Circuit Court of Appeals. This action stops the district court's order to deliver documents to the plaintiffs.

On January 9, 2018, the United States District Court for the Northern District of California temporarily blocked the rescission of the DACA program, ordering the government to renew DACA until further order of the court. On January 13, 2018, the government stated that it would immediately resume approving DACA renewal applications.

On February 13, 2018, Judge Nicholas Garaufis of the U.S. District Court for the Eastern District of New York granted a preliminary injunction ordering the federal government to fully restore the DACA program, including accepting brand new applicants as well as renewals. Moreover, as a rationale for his ruling, Garaufis said that DACA was neither unconstitutional nor in violation of the Administrative Procedure Act (APA) nor the Immigration and Naturalization Act (INA).

On February 26, 2018, the Supreme Court declined to hear the Trump administration's request for it to review the lower court order that the administration must continue to accept DACA applications, so the Supreme Court will allow the Ninth Circuit to review the ruling. The effect of this ruling was to delay implementation of the rescission until at least October 2018.

On April 24, 2018, John D. Bates, a Senior United States District Judge of the United States District Court for the District of Columbia, ruled that the Trump administration must resume accepting new applications for DACA but stayed his decision for 90 days to allow the Department of Homeland Security to explain why the program was being canceled.

On August 3, 2018, Judge Bates said the Trump administration has failed to justify its proposal to end DACA; however, he stayed the ruling for 20 days to allow the Trump administration time to respond and appeal, if it chooses.

On November 12, 2019, the Supreme Court heard arguments for and against the Trump administration's decision to cancel the program. On June 18, 2020, the Supreme Court ruled against the Trump administration's attempt to rescind DACA, saying that the administration failed to provide an adequate reason for its action as required by the Administrative Procedure Act. In the majority opinion, Chief Justice John Roberts wrote, "We do not decide whether DACA or its rescission are sound policies. 'The wisdom' of those decisions 'is none of our concern.' We address only whether the agency complied with the procedural requirement that it provide a reasoned explanation for its action."

A separate case from the Fourth Circuit, Casa De Maryland v. U.S. Dep't of Homeland Sec., had also found the rescinding order arbitrary and capricious, and vacated it with orders to the lower United States District Court for the District of Maryland to review in May 2019. While there, the Supreme Court decision in Regents was made. This led to District Court judge Paul W. Grimm to issue orders on July 17, 2020, that required DHS to restore the DACA program to its pre-rescission status, prior to September 2017, as the first court to make this requirement to the DHS following the SCOTUS decision. This order includes accepting new applicants as it has pre-September 2017, a step that DHS had not done since the rescinding order had been issued.

On July 28, 2020, the Administration tried to get around the court rulings by having DHS issue a new memo to supersede previous DACA memos. New restrictions were put in place while the program was under review. On November 14, a federal judge in New York City ruled that Chad Wolf has not been acting legally as acting head of Homeland Security so his attempts to suspend DACA protections are not valid.

=== Department of Homeland Security v. Regents of the University of California (2020) ===
In June 2020, in Department of Homeland Security v. Regents of the University of California the Supreme Court, ruling on the three injunctions blocking the rescission of the DACA, affirmed that the current reasoning given for the rescission was arbitrary and capricious under the APA, but did not rule on the merits of the DACA itself nor prevented the government from issuing a new rescission with better rationale. NAACP President Derrick Johnson responded to the Supreme Court ruling in statement, saying "For far too long, the voices of the undocumented DACA recipients from the African Diaspora were silenced. There is no democratic dream for anyone if we don't allow our DREAMers to fully participate. This is a tremendous victory for America. Today's Supreme Court ruling in our favor is an incredible victory for justice, in the spirit of the NAACP's groundbreaking Supreme Court victory in Brown v Board of Education."

GQ magazine reported that under NAACP President/CEO Derrick Johnson's leadership, "the nation's foremost and oldest civil rights organization landed a huge win in its Supreme Court case — [then] Trump v. NAACP— that prevents Donald Trump's administration from rescinding the Deferred Action for Childhood Arrivals program for young immigrants." Johnson added, "It's a huge victory for us."

On June 25, 2020, The Hill reported that the NAACP "successfully convinced the Supreme Court to rule against Trump. Its decision to defend DACA, [NAACP President Derrick Johnson] said, came in part because of the organization's traditional role of being a voice for Black communities, including immigrants. 'DACA, oftentimes people seem to think of the Latinx community, when in fact it was far more reaching than that,' Johnson said."

The Washington Post reported that "Trump has often seemed ambivalent about DACA recipients — lauding them at some points and declaring they are "no angels" at others — but his administration has tried since September 2017 to end the program. It was implemented as an executive action by Obama in 2012 after a failed congressional attempt at comprehensive immigration reform."

Justice Roberts wrote in an opinion that "the dispute before the court is not whether DHS may rescind DACA. All parties agree that it may. The dispute is instead primarily about the procedure the agency followed in doing so..."

== Reinstatement by Biden ==
After the 2020 election, President Joe Biden indicated he would reinstate the Deferred Action for Childhood Arrivals program. DACA beneficiaries stated that they would hold him to his promise. "If promises were made to us and we're not seeing that progress, we've never been afraid to go show up in someone's office and say, 'Hey, I thought you were on our side,'" said Kassandra Aleman, 26, a deputy training director for the Texas Democratic Party and a DACA recipient. On January 20, 2021, Biden issued an executive order reinstating DACA.

On July 16, 2021, federal judge Andrew Hanen ruled that the program was "created in violation of the law" and "illegally implemented" after Texas (along with the states of Alabama, Arkansas, Kansas, Louisiana, Mississippi, Nebraska, South Carolina, and West Virginia) sued on the grounds that then president Barack Obama had no authority to create DACA as it bypassed Congress. Hanen barred the government from accepting new applications to the program, effectively cancelling Biden's executive order. However, the ruling allows for immigrants currently protected by the program to keep their status and allow DACA renewals while the case goes through the appeals process.

In June 2024, President Joe Biden launched Keeping Families Together, a new policy addressing immigration issues with a focus on minimizing family separation and providing stability to immigrant communities in the U.S. Like DACA, this policy has faced legal challenges in at least 16 U.S. states.

== During second Trump administration ==
The United States Department of Homeland Security urged DACA recipients to self-deport in 2025. ICE arrested 270 and deported 174 people who were renewing their DACA protections between January and September 2025 according to a mid-April 2026 letter from acting director Todd Lyons to Rep. Delia Ramirez. An administration official noted DACA did not confer legal status to remain in the US. Rep. Ramirez stated the deportations were evidence of a "white nationalist agenda" and called for ICE to be abolished and DHS dismantled.

== See also ==
- Deferred Action for Parents of Americans (DAPA)
- DREAM Act
- Keeping Families Together (KFT)
- Family Fairness Program
- Immigration to the United States
- Undocumented youth in the United States
