= Deferred Action for Parents of Americans =

Planned United States immigration policy for certain undocumented immigrants

Deferred Action for Parents of Americans and Lawful Permanent Residents (DAPA), sometimes called Deferred Action for Parental Accountability, was a planned United States immigration policy to grant deferred action status to certain undocumented immigrants who have lived in the United States since 2010 and have children who are either American citizens or lawful permanent residents. It was prevented from going into effect. Deferred action would not be legal status but would come with a three-year renewable employment authorization document (work permit) and exemption from deportation. DAPA was a presidential executive action, not a law passed by Congress.

The program was announced on November 20, 2014 by President Barack Obama, along with a number of immigration reform steps including increased resources for border enforcement, new procedures for high-skilled immigrants, and an expansion of the existing Deferred Action for Childhood Arrivals (DACA) program.

Several U.S. states filed lawsuits against the federal government on December 3, 2014, arguing that DAPA violates the Constitution and federal statutes. A temporary injunction was issued on February 16, 2015, blocking the program from going into effect while the lawsuit proceeds. The Fifth Circuit Court of Appeals affirmed on November 9, 2015, and a U.S. Supreme Court 4–4 split decision on June 23, 2016, effectively left the block in place.

On June 15, 2017, the Trump administration announced the rescission of the DAPA order.

== Background ==
On June 27, 2013, the U.S. Senate's Gang of Eight passed their comprehensive immigration reform bill in the Senate. When pressed to take unilateral executive action to limit deportations on Univision in March 2014, President Barack Obama replied, "Until Congress passes a new law, then I am constrained in terms of what I am able to do."

On June 9, 2014, House Whip Kevin McCarthy announced that House Republicans had enough votes to pass the bill. However, the next day House Majority Leader Eric Cantor lost his primary election, so on June 30, Speaker John Boehner announced that he would not bring the bill to a vote. That same day, President Obama delivered remarks in the White House Rose Garden promising to "fix as much of our immigration system as [he could] on [his] own, without Congress".

Over the next eight months the Obama Administration went through sixty iterations of different possible executive actions. Finally, on November 20, 2014, President Obama delivered a primetime televised address to the nation announcing DAPA. The Office of Legal Counsel advised that the program was constitutional, finding it was similar to President George H. W. Bush's 1990 "Family Fairness" program. Homeland Security Secretary Jeh Johnson then released two memorandums directing the U.S. Immigration and Customs Enforcement to make undocumented individuals without criminal histories the lowest priority for removal, and to grant deferred action to undocumented immigrants who are the parents of a U.S. citizens or lawful permanent resident.

The President's program, when combined with Deferred Action for Childhood Arrivals, would have delayed deportation of slightly less than half of the 11 million undocumented people in the United States. More than 10 million people in the United States reside in a household with at least one adult who would have been eligible for DAPA, with two thirds of those adults having lived in the United States for 10 years or more. Over half of the undocumented population eligible for the President's delayed deportation live in California, Texas, and New York.

== United States v. Texas ==
On December 3, 2014, Texas and 25 other states, all with Republican governors, sued in the District Court for the Southern District of Texas asking the court to enjoin implementation of both DAPA and the DACA expansion. On February 16, 2015, Judge Andrew S. Hanen issued a preliminary injunction blocking the DAPA program from going into effect while the lawsuit proceeds.

The Obama Administration appealed the order for a preliminary injunction and asked the United States Court of Appeals for the Fifth Circuit in New Orleans to stay the district court's injunction pending appeal. On May 26, 2015, the administration's motion for a stay was denied by a three member motions panel with one dissent, meaning that the government could not implement DAPA until the Fifth Circuit ruled on the appeal of the injunction order itself. That ruling came on November 9, 2015, with a three-member panel of the Fifth Circuit affirming the district court's preliminary injunction, with one dissent.

The divided circuit court affirmed the preliminary injunction and ordered the case back to the district court for trial. Judge Jerry Edwin Smith, joined by Judge Jennifer Walker Elrod agreed with the district court that Texas has standing because of the cost of issuing drivers licenses to undocumented residents, and that President Obama's order violated the rulemaking requirements of the Administrative Procedure Act. The majority made a new finding that the Immigration and Nationality Act "flatly does not permit" deferred action. Judge Carolyn Dineen King dissented, arguing that prosecutorial discretion makes the case non-justiciable, and that there had been "no justification" for the circuit court's delay in ruling.

On November 10, 2015, the Justice Department announced it would ask the Supreme Court to reverse. Texas Attorney General Ken Paxton attempted to prolong consideration of the case until the next October term but the Supreme Court only granted him an eight-day extension to file his opposition brief. The Justice Department further hastened the case by waiving its right to file a reply brief. On January 19, 2016 the Supreme Court agreed to review the case. The Court took the unusual step of asking for briefing on the new constitutional question of whether DAPA violates the Take Care Clause.

On June 23, 2016, the Supreme Court announced it had deadlocked 4–4 in a decision that read, in its entirety, "The judgement is affirmed by an equally divided court." The ruling set no precedent and simply leaves in place the lower court's preliminary injunction blocking the program. Although initially believed that the case could reach the Supreme Court again after Judge Hanen has held a trial, such hopes were dashed by President Trump's rescission of the DACA memo and the subsequent voluntary dismissal by Plaintiffs in the underlying district court action.

== Analysis and studies ==
On January 15, 2015, the Migration Policy Institute estimated that about 3.7 million unauthorized immigrants in the United States are potentially eligible for DAPA, around 766,000 in just five counties: Los Angeles and Orange in California, Harris and Dallas in Texas, and Cook in Illinois.

The President's program, when combined with Deferred Action for Childhood Arrivals, would have delayed deportation of slightly less than half of the 11 million people in the United States who are undocumented. More than 10 million people in the United States reside in a household with at least one adult who would have been eligible for DAPA, with two thirds of those adults having lived in the United States for 10 years or more. Over half of undocumented residents eligible for the President's delayed deportation live in California, Texas, and New York.

The program was challenged in federal court by 26 states. Of the 3.6 million undocumented parents eligible for DAPA, 2.2 million reside in states that did not join the lawsuit.

A 2016 study of the impact of DACA on labor market outcomes for immigrants found that if the same effects apply to DAPA as DACA, then DAPA could potentially move over 250,000 unauthorized immigrants into employment.

== Eligibility ==
If DAPA had been implemented, a person would have been eligible if the person

- had lived in the United States without interruption since January 1, 2010,
- had been physically present in the United States on November 20, 2014 (the date the program was announced),
- had been physically present in the United States when applying to the program,
- had lacked lawful immigration status on November 20, 2014,
- had, as of November 20, 2014, a child who is a U.S. citizen or lawful permanent resident,
- had not been convicted of a felony, significant misdemeanor, or three or more other misdemeanors, and
- had not "otherwise pose a threat to national security or be an enforcement priority for removal".

== See also ==
- Anchor baby
- Deferred Action for Childhood Arrivals (DACA)
- DREAM Act
- Keeping Families Together (KFT)
- Family Fairness Program
- Immigration to the United States
- History of laws concerning immigration and naturalization in the United States
