= Family Fairness =

US immigration policy for spouses and children of certain immigrants

Family Fairness was a program run by the Immigration and Naturalization Service in the United States from late 1987 to late 1990 that granted deferred action to spouses and children of immigrants who were granted amnesty in 1986. The initial version was introduced in late 1987 by then INS Commissioner Alan C. Nelson, working under then Attorney General Edwin Meese and then President Ronald Reagan. An expansion of the program was introduced in early 1990 by INS Commissioner Gene McNary working under then Attorney General Dick Thornburgh and then United States President George H. W. Bush. The program was created through executive action, in order to meet the problem of "split-eligibility" families created by the Immigration Reform and Control Act of 1986, pending legislation that would address the issue. The Immigration Act of 1990 replaced it with a legislatively sanctioned Family Unity Program, that continues to be in force today.

== Background ==
Two important classes of people that the Act granted temporary legal status and a path to permanent residency were:

1. People continuously present in the United States since January 1, 1982
2. Special agricultural workers (SAW)

At the time of the passage of the Act, it was estimated that 3 million people would be eligible to legalize based on these provisions, but the number would rise later. However, the IRCA provided no special provision for legalization for the spouses and children of eligible people if they did not independently qualify; they would have to "wait in line" but might eventually become eligible once the originally-eligible applicant had acquired permanent residency or citizenship.

That led to a problem of "split-eligibility" families, with only some members of the family being eligible for temporary legal status. The issue was highlighted by the National Conference of Catholic Bishops, which asked President Ronald Reagan to address the issue. The Los Angeles Catholic Archdiocese estimated that 30% of the legalization applications it was assisting involved split-eligibility families. Los Angeles Archbishop Roger Mahony wrote a strongly-worded letter to INS Commissioner Alan C. Nelson that urged him to address the problem of split eligibility by making spouses and children of eligible people eligible and by capping fees for individuals at $50 and total fees for families at $100.

Republican Senator John Chafee, from Rhode Island, proposed an amendment to an unrelated bill that would give spouses and children of IRCA-eligible individuals a path to legalization. The amendment was defeated by a 55-45 vote and was the subject of criticism by Simpson, a co-sponsor of the original IRCA, who said that the amendment was against the spirit of the original legislation and the careful balance it had struck.

== First announcement ==
Until the announcement of the Family Fairness executive action, the INS interpreted the IRCA strictly: only people who were eligible according to the IRCA rules were provided temporary legal status. On October 21, 1987, Nelson, Commissioner of the Immigration and Naturalization Service, announced the "Family Fairness" executive action. Nelson was working under Attorney General Edwin Meese and President Ronald Reagan. The executive action allowed for deferred deportation for:

- Children under 18 if both their parents (or the single parent, if they were living with only one parent) were eligible for legal status under IRCA.
- Spouses of IRCA-eligible individuals only in case of compelling or humanitarian factors, with the fact of marriage alone being insufficient. Describing the executive action to The New York Times, INS spokesman Gregory J. Leo said that serious illness, handicap, or old age all qualified as compelling humanitarian factors.

While precise estimates of the impact of the executive action were not available, both the INS and Hispanic groups such as the National Council of La Raza agreed that it would likely affect more than 100,000 families.

In testimony before the House Judiciary subcommittee on immigration, INS Commissioner Nelson clarified that no information in the application would be used to initiate deportation proceedings or used in any way against the applicant.

A number of people thought that the executive action did not go far enough, including Representative Howard Berman, future INS Commissioner Doris Meissner, and United States Catholic Conference immigration lawyer Gilbert Paul Carrasco.

Legislative efforts to block the deportation of spouses and children of IRCA-eligible individuals would continue to stumble for the next few years.

== Second announcement ==
On February 2, 1990, INS Commissioner Gene McNary, working under Attorney General Dick Thornburgh and newly-elected President George H. W. Bush, announced a significant liberalization of the Family Fairness program, effective February 14. The changes would prevent the deportation of most spouses and children of legalized individuals. Specifically, spouses and children of a legalized alien were eligible for relief from deportation if:

1. They were living with the legalized alien
2. They had been residing in the United States continuously since November 6, 1986 (and could prove it)
3. They were admissible as immigrants
4. They had not been convicted of a felony or three or more misdemeanors in the United States
5. They had not assisted in persecuting others

McNary clarified that for a spouse to be eligible, the marriage must have occurred before November 6, 1986. He also said that children over 18 were not eligible for this program but would most likely not be deported, and would continue to receive voluntary departure and work authorization.

== Superseding by Family Unity Program ==
The Immigration Act of 1990 included a Family Unity Program (Section 301 of the Act), effective October 1, 1991, which legislatively superseded the Family Fairness Program. The Family Unity Program continues to be active, as of 2017.

== Comparison with later deferred action by Obama ==
The Family Fairness program has been compared with executive actions by President Barack Obama, specifically Deferred Action for Parents of Americans (abbreviated DAPA, announced November 20, 2014). The Obama administration, as well as some groups supportive of Obama's deferred action have argued in favor of the similarities, in order to make the case that Obama's deferred action has precedent. FactCheck, describing the argument, said: "We can't speak to whether these actions by previous presidents provide legal preceden[t] for Obama's actions."

Josh Blackman has argued that the Reagan/Bush Family Fairness program differed from Obama's actions in a critical way: the Family Fairness program only provided a "bridge" for people who could eventually qualify for legal status based on already-existing or in-process legislation, whereas Obama's deferred action provided protections for people who did not have any path to legal status with existing legislation.

== See also ==
- Deferred Action for Childhood Arrivals (DACA)
- Deferred Action for Parents of Americans (DAPA)
- Keeping Families Together (KFT)
