= Deferred action =

US law delaying deportation for undocumented immigrants

In United States administrative law, deferred action is an immigration classification which the executive branch can grant to undocumented immigrants. This does not give them legal status but can indefinitely delay their deportation and they may be eligible for an employment authorization document. Deferred action is an exercise of the executive branch's enforcement discretion and was first publicly defined in a 1975 administrative guidance document published by the Immigration and Naturalization Service.

Major grants of deferred action include:

- Family Fairness Program, a program launched by President Ronald Reagan in 1987, and expanded by President George H. W. Bush in 1990, which granted deferred action to spouses and children of immigrants granted amnesty under the Immigration Reform and Control Act of 1986.
- Deferred Action for Childhood Arrivals (DACA), a 2012 program launched by President Barack Obama aimed at unauthorized immigrants who arrived in the United States as children.
- Deferred Action for Parents of Americans (DAPA), a 2014 program launched by President Barack Obama for immigrants who have citizen or permanent resident children.
