= Impacts of restrictive abortion laws in the United States =

The fallout from Dobbs v. Jackson Women's Health Organization and the resulting restrictive abortion policies are causing increasing barriers to abortion access in the United States, which is statistically negatively affecting, among other things, the health and well-being of pregnant women and young children, with ripple effects to other populations.

== Deaths of pregnant people ==
Since new post-Roe stringent, restrictive abortion laws have been implemented, maternal deaths nationwide rose 11%, with certain states much higher, such as Texas which had a 56% increase in maternal deaths. Texas has legally prohibited a committee from reviewing maternal deaths in the years following Dobbs. Indiana does not include delays in access to abortion care as elements contributing to death.

Some specific deaths stemming from restrictive abortion laws include:

- Josseli Barnica had doctors note that she had a miscarriage in progress at 17 weeks, but since "it would be a crime to give her an abortion," the doctors waited to help expel any tissue until the fetal heartbeat had completely stopped. And Josseli Barnica died of an infection. More than a dozen medical experts who reviewed her hospital and autopsy records stated their professional opinion was that her death was due to her not getting care in time, despite being in the hospital where she could have received it, had the doctors not refused.
- Nevaeh Crain felt ill on October 29, 2023. She was vomiting with a fever and was unable to walk. She went to two hospitals to try to receive care. At the first one, she was diagnosed with strep throat with no investigation into her sharp abdominal cramps. At the second hospital, she was diagnosed with sepsis, which is life-threatening, but told to return home due to the fact that her fetus still had a heartbeat. She went to a third hospital, which performed two ultrasounds over the course of two hours to "confirm fetal demise" before moving her to intensive care. However, at this point, Crain's organs were already failing, and she died.
- Candi Miller, a 41-year-old mother of three accidentally fell pregnant, but had numerous medical complications with doctors warning having another baby could kill her. Without the ability to get an abortion in Georgia, she sent away for an abortion medication. After taking the medication, she did not fully pass all the tissue and was afraid of going to the doctor, thinking she could go to jail as performing a dilation and curettage was a felony by Georgia law. After a few days of suffering with not fully expelled tissue, her husband found her unresponsive in bed with her 3-year-old daughter next to her. She was pronounced dead on November 12, 2022.
- When Porsha Ngumezi was experiencing a miscarriage, and "passing large clots the size of grapefruit," needing two blood transfusions, the doctors refused to perform a D&C due to strict Texas abortion laws. Over a dozen doctors reviewed her case and stated she would not have died had she gotten a dilation & curettage.
- Amber Nicole Thurman, a medical assistant from Georgia was taken to a hospital after losing consciousness at her home. She had an infection that continued to get worse over a span of 20 hours. Even when being diagnosed with sepsis, a D&C still was not performed as a fetal heartbeat still remained. Once medical intervention was given, things had progressed to her needing a hysterectomy, and she died on the table. An official state committee deemed her death as preventable.
- Taysha Wilkinson-Sobieski. In October 2023, with a growing shortage of OBGYNs in Indiana after stricter abortion laws have passed, Wilinson-Sobieski's local hospital had recently shut down their labor and delivery ward; when she came in for help, no physician there could/would treat her. Her mother took her to the Regional Medical Center, where Wilkinson-Sobieski died from a ruptured ectopic pregnancy.
- Ciji Graham. In November 2023, after becoming pregnant, Graham experienced worsening heart complications linked to her history of atrial fibrillation. Her cardiologists did not perform a procedure that outside experts later said was generally safe in pregnancy, and she faced delays in accessing abortion care due to state requirements and limited appointment availability. She died before receiving either intervention, and her case has been cited in discussions about how medical uncertainty and abortion restrictions can affect care for high-risk patients.
- Tierra Walker. In December 2024, Walker, a pregnant woman in Texas with chronic hypertension and a history of severe pregnancy complications, repeatedly sought care as her condition worsened, including seizures and blood clots. Despite her high-risk status, she was not offered an abortion under the state’s restrictive laws. She died at 20 weeks from preeclampsia, and her case has been cited in discussions about delayed care and maternal mortality under abortion bans.

== Rise in infant mortality ==
In April 2023, national infant mortality was 7% higher than normal (pre-the overturning of Roe v Wade), resulting in an average of 247 extra infant deaths per month. Texas had the highest infant mortality rise in the year after Dobbs; infant deaths rose 13%. Many of these deaths were due to fetal abnormalities; deaths due to birth defects went up 23%, as the Texas Heartbeat Act bans all abortions after six weeks, with no exceptions for rape, incest or fetal abnormalities. "In the absence of an abortion ban, pregnant people that receive a diagnosis of a fetal anomaly would be counseled on the option to terminate, which is the choice many people make when the anomalies are incompatible with life or would cause significant suffering for the child.

When asked whether this was merely correlation, or causation, public health expert Dr. Suzanne Bell explained they used "one of the strongest study designs for estimating causality... which make us confident that the increase in infant mortality we observed in Texas during this period was a result of S.B.8.

== Inequality ==
Abortion restrictions disproportionately affect people of color, immigrants, low-income earners, and non-English speakers. This is on top of the United States' existing racial inequities in maternal and neonatal outcomes, such as Black women being over twice as likely to experience maternal mortality and severe maternal morbidity than white women.

In 1973, the Roe v. Wade decision reduced maternal mortality rates by 30–40% for people of color; "Legal abortion substantially improved maternal health for disadvantaged groups." But Dobbs overturned Roe v Wade's ruling, removing federal protection for abortion access and allowing states to regulate, limit, or ban abortion.

== Negative impacts on medical training ==
"Abortion-restrictions hamper physicians' skills needed to care for patients, particularly in emergent situations. This puts patients at risk and places physicians in precarious ethical positions."

Medical residents now have a gap in education as over half of OB-GYN residency training programs are in states with restrictive abortion laws. Even if there is the odd abortion procedure in a state with strict laws, it's not going to be enough for residents to truly learn, argues some doctors, including Kavita Vinekar, MD, an OB-GYN at the David Geffen School of Medicine at UCLA in Los Angeles. She says, "when it comes to learning procedures, the way you master a skill is by doing it over and over. Volume is everything. And where abortion is practically out of the picture, that exposure declines significantly."

And in some states abortion training is so limited that residents must go out of state just to learn to perform abortions. For instance, two Texas OB-GYN residents had to rotate to a California hospital for a month to try to bridge this gap in their training.

Hospitals having to put in more resources to bridge gaps in their residents' training are then taking resources away from other initiatives, for instance, at a Texas hospital a rotation in complex family planning had to be shuttered.

As of 2021, 20% of medical schools did not report providing curricular related content to abortion. In the year 2022, it was projected that of that year's class of medical residents, 70.77% of the 129,295 (91,502) US medical students have medical training restricted by state laws, due to highly restrictive abortion laws. 57% of OB-GYN residency programs are at risk-averse hospitals with even stricter laws than the state laws regulating those hospitals.

Restrictive abortion laws have ripple effects into other areas outside of OB-GYN. "Oncologists, cardiologists, and neurosurgeons will be unable to perform lifesaving interventions for pregnant patients with a positive urine pregnancy test."

== Rise in elective sterilizations ==
Analysis of medical record data showed a steep rise, among those eighteen to thirty years old, in sterilization procedures, following the Dobbs ruling, such as tubal ligations and vasectomies. Dr. Tyler Handcock, an OB-GYN explained his patients "want something permanent because they fear that tomorrow there'll be no other option." He stated that in a normal week, he'd have maybe one or two patients inquire about sterilization, but in the weekend following the decision, he received 200 messages asking about it. Between 2022 and 2024, the general fertility rate in the United States reached a historic low, which some think is related to people having too many concerns about getting pregnant with these dangerous laws in effect.

== More context on restrictive abortion laws ==
In the first six months of 2021, it was "Already the Worst Legislative Year Ever for U.S. Abortion Rights" - with more than 90 abortion restrictions being implemented in just the first half of the year, which was already more than any other year since 1973 - since the Roe v. Wade ruling in 1973.

Some restrictions with new abortion laws range from geographic, transportation, and financial barriers in addition to decreasing already limited training opportunities medical professionals, plus dangerous medical precedents that put women's lives at risk.

As of late 2019, the majority people at risk for getting pregnant live in the US live in abortion-hostile states. Since the Dobbs v. Jackson Women's Health Organization decision, over half of the states have been able to either put new laws in place or use trigger laws that previously were not able to be enforced post-Roe ruling.

== Obstacles due to restrictive abortion laws ==
Over ten million people live in an area where they would need to travel over an hour to reach the nearest abortion clinic. Some who have to make long treks, go into debt that causes significant financial hardship, not only paying for medical care, but now paying for transportation, potentially lodging, and lost time from work. This not only impacts the distance these individual patients must travel, but also the congestion of each center serving both local and visiting patients. The influx of patients at some facilities as others close their doors, due to restrictive abortion restrictions, negatively impacts not only the clinic's ability and bandwidth to perform abortions, but also its ability to provide additional healthcare services offered at reproductive health care clinics, such as mammograms and pap smears.

== The impact of abortion legislation on OB-GYN opportunities ==
The fluctuating abortion legislation in the United States has a significant impact on the financial opportunities for obstetrician-gynecologist (OB-GYN) physicians, with significant implications for women's access to comprehensive reproductive care. Restrictive abortion laws not only influence where physicians choose to practice but also impact their training, job satisfaction, and the overall availability of reproductive health services for women. This evolving legal landscape continues to shape the future of OB-GYN practice, affecting both the stability of the workforce and the quality of reproductive healthcare nationwide.

== Physician distribution and financial opportunity ==
There has been a notable decline in residency applications in states enforcing strict abortion bans. Data from the Association of American Medical Colleges (AAMC) indicates that during the 2023-2024 application cycle, states that completely outlawed abortion experienced a 4.2% decrease in applications from fourth-year medical students. In contrast, states without these restrictions experienced only a 0.6% decline in applications. This trend suggests that new physicians are increasingly reluctant to train or practice in states with restrictive abortion laws, potentially due to concerns about legal risks and ethical dilemmas.

This trend also has direct financial implications for OB-GYNs. Physicians practicing in these restrictive states may face reduced patient volumes and a limited scope of practice, leading to decreased revenue. Additionally, the potential for legal repercussions can result in higher malpractice insurance premiums, causing more issues for these doctors. On the other hand, states with protective abortion laws in favor of women's reproductive rights may see an influx of OB-GYN applicants, potentially saturating the market and impacting individual earning potential. Therefore, the long-term economic and professional consequences of abortion legislation extend far beyond immediate patient care and present a complex challenge for the medical field.

== Additional training limitations and professional development ==
The legal implications surrounding abortion access has had major consequences on the education and training of future OB-GYNs, directly shaping their competency and preparedness upon entering the field. The Dobbs v. Jackson Women's Health Organization decision is an example of how restrictive abortion laws have aggravated challenges in abortion training for medical professionals. With more than half of OB-GYN residency programs located in the United States residing in states with restrictive abortion laws, medical students are experiencing restricted access to gain comprehensive training in abortion care. This gap not only affects the competency of future OB-GYNs but also their financial prospects, as limited skill set can reduce job opportunities and earning potential.

Moreover, hospitals in restrictive states may need to allocate additional resources to account for these training gaps, diverting funds from other critical areas. To address these gaps, some institutions have had to establish partnerships with out-of-state facilities to ensure their residents receive necessary abortion training. This approach, while essential, imposes logistical and financial burdens on both the residents and the institutions involved. The need for residents to travel to other states for training not only disrupts their educational experience also diverts resources that could be utilized to other critical areas within the hospital. Such reallocations can hinder overall quality of medical education and patient care.

== Physician well-being and retention ==
Restrictive abortion laws contribute to moral distress among OB-GYNs, leading to burnout and attrition. A qualitative study revealed that OB-GYNs practicing under abortion bans reported anxiety, depression, and intentions to leave their practice. This attrition worsens ongoing physician shortages, increasing workloads for remaining providers and potentially compromising patient care. As more physicians leave these states, hospitals and clinics may struggle to maintain adequate staffing levels, further limiting access to reproductive healthcare. In turn, this can create a cycle where fewer medical professionals are willing to train or practice in these regions, exacerbating the shortage.

The financial consequences are significant, in that recruiting and training new OB-GYNs are costly endeavors. High turnover rates can also strain healthcare systems financially. Lastly, understaffed facilities may face reduced patient satisfaction and potential loss of revenue.

== Access to care and health outcomes ==
The redistribution of OB-GYNs away from restrictive states leads to "maternal care deserts," where access to reproductive healthcare is severely limited. Women in these areas may encounter increased travel distances, longer wait times, and higher out-of-pocket costs to receive care. This reduced access can result in delayed diagnoses and treatments, adversely affecting health outcomes. In the long term, these disparities may contribute to higher maternal and infant mortality rates, disproportionately affecting marginalized and low-income communities.

From an academic perspective, reduced access to reproductive care can increase healthcare costs due to complications arising from delayed or insufficient care. For instance, untreated or poorly managed pregnancies can lead to emergency situations requiring costly interventions. Moreover, the broader economy may suffer as women facing reproductive health challenges may need extended time off work or may be unable to participate fully in the workforce.

== See also ==
- Abortion law in the United States by state
- Abortion in the United States
- Misinformation related to abortion
- Abortion
