= Mark Dickson =

Mark Dickson may refer to:

- Mark Dickson (footballer) (born 1981), Northern Irish football (soccer) player
- Mark Dickson (tennis) (born 1959), professional tour tennis player of the 1980s and from the United States
- Mark Lee Dickson (anti-abortion advocate)

== See also ==
- Mark Dixon (disambiguation)
