= Abortion in Texas =

Abortion in Texas is illegal in most cases. There are nominally exceptions to save the mother's life, or prevent "substantial impairment of major bodily function", but the law on abortion in Texas is written in such an ambiguous way that life-threatening or harmful pregnancies do not explicitly constitute an exception. Attempts to clarify and codify these exceptions into law have been rejected by Republican lawmakers in Texas.

This has resulted in some expectant mothers with health problems being forced to carry until birth, jeopardizing their health, even resulting in deaths. Some pregnant women leave the state to seek an abortion elsewhere, with an estimated 35,000 women crossing Texas state lines for legal abortions in 2023. Anyone who aids or abets an illegal abortion in Texas can be sued for wrongful death. In March 2023, a Galveston man sued three friends of his ex-wife for wrongful death, after they helped her obtain illegal abortion pills that were used to terminate her pregnancy. The lawsuit was dropped on October 10, 2024, as part of a confidential settlement with the defendants.

The legal status of abortion in Texas is due to a trigger law passed in July 2021 that came in effect on August 25, 2022, as a consequence of the U.S. Supreme Court's 2022 decision Dobbs v. Jackson Women's Health Organization overturning Roe v. Wade. The law makes no exception for pregnancies resulting from rape or incest. In May 2021, the Republican-controlled Texas legislature passed the Texas Heartbeat Act (SB 8) that banned abortion after the detection of embryonic or fetal cardiac activity. This stage of development normally occurs after about six weeks of pregnancy, earlier than when most women know that they are pregnant. This act relied solely on enforcement by private individuals through civil lawsuits, thus evading pre-enforcement challenges based on Roe v. Wade. Before the enactment of this law, elective abortions had been allowed up to 20 weeks post-fertilization.

In August 2023, Texas Governor Greg Abbott signed HB 3058 into law, allowing doctors to provide abortions in the case of an ectopic pregnancy or if a pregnant patient's water breaks too early, rendering the fetus unviable. In December 2023, the Texas Supreme Court ruled that a pregnant woman whose fetus was diagnosed with a fatal condition, and whose pregnancy posed a threat to her health, could not be permitted to receive an abortion. In June 2024, the Texas Supreme Court further upheld the state's criminalization of abortion. The cities of Austin, Dallas, Denton, El Paso, and Houston have enacted resolutions instructing city officials to de-prioritize enforcement of the state's abortion laws, but anyone violating the state's abortion laws in those cities remains subject to criminal prosecution by the district attorney (a county official), and civil penalties imposed by the state attorney general.

The stringent restrictions on abortion have had negative spill-over effects on OB-GYN and neo-natal care in the state, as OB-GYN providers have increasingly left the state, and as infant and neo-natal deaths have increased. According to a ProPublica analysis, sepsis rates related to second-trimester pregnancies have substantially increased since the abortion ban was implemented.

== Terminology ==
Reflecting its nature and legislative intent, the Texas Heartbeat Act uses the term "unborn child" for the fetus or embryo irrespective of the gestational phase in the definition section: "'Unborn child' means a human fetus or embryo in any stage of gestation from fertilization until birth." Texas Health and Safety Code Sec. 171.201(7).

The use of 'heartbeat' in the Act is considered misleading by some medical and reproductive health experts. They assert that referring to a 'heartbeat' is medically inaccurate. The embryo does not have a developed heart at 6 weeks' gestation.

== History ==
=== Political support ===
One of the largest groups of women strongly tending to oppose legal abortion in the United States is southern white evangelical Christians. Outside of this one group, there are no large demographic groups who oppose legal abortion. All other major religious groups, including both Protestant and Catholic Christians, have a pro-choice majority, albeit a slight one. The push by lawmakers to penalize women accessing abortion with jail time are men, including five Texan legislators who authored a bill to punish women who have received abortions with the death penalty.

Historically, polls have shown that a slight plurality of Texans identify as pro-life.

=== Legislative history ===
By the end of the 1800s, every state in the Union except Louisiana had therapeutic exceptions in their legislative bans on abortions. In the 19th century, bans on abortion by state legislatures were concerned with protecting the life of the mother, given the number of deaths caused by abortions. State governments saw themselves as looking out for the lives of their citizens. In 1854, Texas passed an abortion law that made performing an abortion, except in the case of preserving the life of the mother, a criminal offense punishable by two to five years in prison. The law, found in Articles 4512.1 to 4512.4, had a provision stipulating that anyone who provided medication or other means to assist in performing an abortion was an accomplice who could also be charged.

==== 1990s ====
Following the US Supreme Court ruling in Roe v. Wade in 1973, the State of Texas decided not to repeal abortion laws on the books that had become unconstitutional and unenforceable. A law passed in 1992 said that only Texas-licensed physicians could perform an abortion in the state. A law passed in 1997 gave physicians, nurses, health care provider employees and hospital employees who objected to abortions the ability to refuse to participate directly or indirectly in the procedure. Private hospitals were allowed to refuse the use of their facilities to provide abortion services unless a physician determined that the pregnant woman's life was in immediate danger.

Twenty-one abortion-related bills were introduced in the Texas legislature in 1997. Five were eventually enacted: TX SB 407 (1997), TX SB 1534 (1997), TX HB 1 (1997), YX HB 39 (1997), and TX HB 2856 (1997). TX SB 407 allowed for the Texas Department of Health to suspend the license of an abortion facility if the health and safety of people using the facility were threatened. This bill was introduced by Senator Chris Harris on February 5, 1997, and passed on February 18, 1997, by a voice vote. It then continued to the House, where it passed by a voice vote on April 18, 1997, before being signed into law by Governor George W. Bush on May 1, 1997. TX SB 1534 dealt with funding, stating that no state funding could be used to support, either directly or indirectly, abortion or abortion-related issues. Introduced by Democratic Senator Gonzalo Barrientos on March 20, 1997, the wording about abortion was only added to the legislation during negotiations between the House and the Senate, with the amended version passing both houses in mid-May 1997. TX HB1 said that funds allocated for the Department of Health for family planning services could not be used by the Department of Health or any organizations it provides money to in support of abortion services, either directly or indirectly. This included a proviso that said this was organization-wide, not just as it relates to specific facilities. Representatives Republican McCall, Democrat Leticia Van de Putte, Democrat Gray, Democrat Greenberg and Republican Solomons introduced TX HB39 on January 28, 1997. Originally only about genetic testing with no mention of abortion, the legislation was amended by the Senate, stating that genetic testing of a fetus could not be done on the fetus without the consent of the mother and that the results of any subsequent genetic testing could not be used to compel or coerce a woman into getting an abortion, including having an insurance company threaten the eligibility of health care coverage. These changes were then passed by the House and the bill was signed into law by Governor Bush on June 20, 1997.

TX HB 2856 put in new requirements for abortion clinics, inspection procedures of clinics and a clinic's ability to advertise. It said the Texas Department of Health had to assign each licensed abortion clinic a unique number, clinics needed to have this number in any advertising materials and created a toll-free number people could call to check the status of a clinic's license. Information on the toll-free number had to be provided to women seeking abortion services by the facility offering them at the time of appointment. This law underwent some changes before being passed by voice vote in the House on May 13, 1997, and by a vote of 31 - 0 in the Senate on May 26, 1997. It was signed into law by Governor Bush on June 19, 1997. TX SB 96 reached a floor vote but was eventually removed from consideration following a point of order on May 27, 1997. It would have required minors seeking abortions without parental consent to have the procedure first approved by a physician not located at an abortion clinic certifying the need for the abortion because of physical, sexual or emotional harm caused by continuing the pregnancy. It would have also required minors to wait 48 hours before being able to have an abortion after their physician contacts their parents to notify the parents of approval for the procedure.

==== 2000s ====
On January 1, 2000, Senate Bill (SB 30)'s parental notification requirements became applicable, requiring a physician notify the parent, managing conservator, or guardian of an unemancipated minor before performing an abortion. Texas thereby became the 30th and most populous U.S. state to implement such a requirement. The law provided exceptions for judicial bypass if the court determined that the minor was mature and sufficiently informed to make the decision, that notification would not be in the minor's best interest, or that notification might lead to physical, sexual, or emotional abuse. It also provided a medical-emergency exception when a physician determined that an immediate abortion was necessary to avert the minor's death or a serious risk of substantial and irreversible impairment of a major bodily function.

A study by researchers Silvie Colman and Theodore Joyce found that, from 2000 to 2003, the second trimester abortion rate among girls who conceived at ages 17 years and 8–9 months increased by 21% relative to the 1998–1999 pre-law period. In 2003, the legislature passed a law that required all abortions after 16 weeks take place in an outpatient surgery center and required a 24-hour waiting period before women could get an abortion. Clinics were also required to give women a "Woman's Right to Know" pamphlet which included factually incorrect medical information. In 2005, the 79th Legislature enacted several laws related to abortion. One was a parental consent law. They also passed a "late-term" abortion ban. Other laws dealt with the funding aspects of abortion and family planning, trying to prevent funds for women's reproductive health from going to organizations that provided information about abortions or provided abortion services.

On September 1, 2005, SB 419 took effect, making Texas the 21st and most populous U.S. state to require written consent from the parent, managing conservator, or guardian of an parent, managing conservator, or guardian before a physician could perform an abortion. The law provided exceptions for judicial bypass under Sections 33.003 and 33.004, and medical emergencies under Section 33.002(a)(3) of the Texas Family Code.

Texas was one of 23 states in 2007 to have detailed abortion-specific informed consent requirements. Statute-required informed consent materials given to women in Texas used graphic and inflammatory language. The law also required the woman to be told how far advanced her pregnancy was. Texas was among states to have passed laws requiring abortion providers to warn patients of a link between abortion and breast cancer and to issue other scientifically unsupported warnings. Informed consent materials given to women seeking abortions in Texas include counseling materials claiming women who have abortions may have suicidal thoughts or experience "post-abortion traumatic stress syndrome." The latter syndrome is not recognized by American Psychological Association or the American Psychiatric Association. Informed consent materials about fetal pain in Texas say the ability of the fetus to feel pain does not exist until 20 weeks, before concluding that it is unknown if a fetus can feel pain at 12 weeks. The legislature tried to pass a "mandatory ultrasound" bill but it failed to pass in 2007.

==== 2010s ====
As of March 2012, 20 states required women seeking an abortion to have an ultrasound before being allowed to have the procedure. Mandatory transvaginal ultrasounds have been particularly controversial. In Texas, for instance, even if previous ultrasounds had indicated severe birth defects, a woman seeking an abortion was required under a 2012 law to have another ultrasound done, "administered by her abortion doctor, and [she had to] listen to a state-mandated description of the fetus she was about to abort", though state-issued guidelines later eliminated the ultrasound requirement if the fetus had an "irreversible medical condition". In 2013, a state Targeted Regulation of Abortion Providers (TRAP) law was applied to medication-induced abortions and private doctor offices.

An early pregnancy abortion bill was previously introduced in Texas by Representative Phil King on July 18, 2013, in the wake of Rick Perry signing Texas Senate Bill 5 into law. The bill was not passed. Supporters of Texas Senate Bill 5, which included requirements for abortion clinics to meet ambulatory surgical center regulations and for abortion clinic doctors to have hospital admitting privileges, said the bill improved health care for women and babies. Opponents of the bill said it created unnecessary regulations for the purpose of reducing access to abortions. At the time of the bill's signing into law in 2013, only five of the state's forty-two abortion clinics met the law's requirements. Courts had blocked the enforcement of similar laws in some other states, pending lawsuits challenging their constitutionality. A federal district judge determined this law to be unconstitutional, finding that the admitting privileges requirement placed an undue burden on a person seeking to have an abortion; however, this decision was reversed by the Fifth Circuit Court of Appeals, resulting in the immediate closure of all but seven abortion clinics in the state, all of these in urban areas. For patients in Texas's Rio Grande Valley, the nearest clinic was 300 miles away.

While cities like Austin passed legislation to require Crisis Pregnancy Centers (CPCs) to disclose their status and that they did not offer abortion services, organizations representing the CPCs have been successful in courts challenging these laws, principally on the argument that forcing the CPCs to post such language violated their First Amendment rights and constituted compelled speech. While previous attempts at regulating CPCs in Baltimore and other cities were based on having signage that informed the patient that the CPC did not offer abortion-related services, the FACT Act instead makes the patient aware of state-sponsored services that are available rather than what the CPCs did or did not offer. The law went into effect January 1, 2016.

In 2017, Texas was one of six states where the legislature introduced a bill that would have banned abortion in almost all cases. It did not pass. Among those who believe that abortion is murder, some believe it may be appropriate to punish it with death. While attempts to criminalize abortion generally focus on the doctor, Texas state Rep. Tony Tinderholt (R) introduced a bill in 2017 and 2019 that may enable the death penalty in Texas for women who have abortions, and the Ohio legislature considered a similar bill in 2018. On February 7, 2019, Briscoe Cain, a member of the Texas House of Representatives, introduced an early pregnancy abortion bill entitled the Texas Heartbeat Bill. The bill (HB 1500) was joint authored by Representatives Phil King, Dan Flynn, Tan Parker, and Rick Miller. As of February 26, 2019, HB 1500 had 57 sponsors or cosponsors of the 150 members of the Texas House of Representatives. Former State Senator Wendy Davis said HB 1500 is "the most dangerous I've ever seen." In 2019, Texas had some of the most restrictive abortion laws in the country. In mid-May 2019, because of judicial rulings, abortion was effectively banned after week 22.

On June 7, 2019, Texas Governor Greg Abbott signed abortion legislation that was set to go into effect on September 1. This legislation said that local governments could not do business with any organization that provided abortion services, including through the offering of tax breaks or by leasing municipal-owned buildings to such organizations. The legislation also prevents local governments from "advocacy or lobbying on behalf of the interests of an abortion provider or affiliate." An exception was provided for non-abortion clinics that perform fewer than 50 abortions a year, such as doctor offices, hospitals or ambulatory services.

==== 2020s ====
In March 2021, Bryan Slaton introduced a bill that would abolish abortion and make it a criminal act, whereby women and physicians who received and performed abortions, respectively, could receive the death penalty. The bill made no exceptions for rape or incest; it did provide exemptions for ectopic pregnancies that threaten the life of the woman "when a reasonable alternative to save the lives of both the mother and the unborn child is unavailable."

In May 2021, Texas lawmakers passed the Texas Heartbeat Act, banning abortions as soon as fetal cardiac activity can be detected, typically as early as six weeks into pregnancy and often before women know they are pregnant. In order to avoid traditional constitutional challenges based on Roe v. Wade, the law provides that any person, with or without any vested interest, may sue anyone that performs or induces abortion in violation of the statute, as well as anyone who "aids or abets the performance or inducement of an abortion, including paying for or reimbursing the costs of an abortion through insurance or otherwise." It was signed into law by Governor Greg Abbott on May 15, 2021.

The Heartbeat Act authorizes lawsuits not only against abortion providers, but also against abortion funders, employers, and insurance companies that defray the costs of abortion, along with anyone else who "aids or abets" an unlawful abortion by providing referrals, transportation, or any type of logistical support. Anyone who is successfully sued for violating the Act can be found liable for a minimum of $10,000 for each abortion performed (or assisted) in violation of the Act, plus costs and attorneys' fees.

At the same time, the Act specifically prohibits state officials from enforcing the Act, leaving enforcement entirely in the hands of private litigants who will sue those who violate the statute. The law was written this way to prevent abortion providers from challenging the constitutionality of the statute before it takes effect in the ordinary manner, which involves injunction suits against state officials charged with enforcement in federal court. Instead, abortion providers must wait until someone sues them for violating the statute, and then assert their constitutional claims defensively.

The trigger law HB 1280 Human Life Protection Act was signed into law on June 6, 2021. It would take effect 30 days after Roe v. Wade was overturned and creates a first degree felony for "providing an abortion leading to death of the unborn child, excepting cases where there is a risk of death or a substantial impairment of a major bodily function of the mother."

On December 2, 2021, a new law against medication abortions took effect. The law requires doctors to examine the patient in person before prescribing the pills and makes it a felony for doctors to send the pills to the patient by a delivery service. It also prohibits doctors from prescribing the abortion pill after seven weeks of pregnancy (whereas the U.S. Food and Drug Administration allows it up to 10 weeks). The bill had been previously signed by Governor Greg Abbott.

On June 24, 2022, the U.S. Supreme Court issued its decision in Dobbs v. Jackson Women's Health Organization, overturning Roe v. Wade and Planned Parenthood v. Casey, eliminating the federal constitutional right to abortion and restoring the enforceability of Texas's abortion statutes under Articles 4512.1–4512.4 and 4512.6 of the Texas Revised Civil Statutes, which prohibited abortion except when necessary to save the mother's life and prescribed a maximum penalty of five years' imprisonment for performing an abortion. On the same day, all 23 Texas clinics that had previously provided abortion care had ceased offering abortion services.

In August 2023, Texas Governor Greg Abbott signed HB 3058 into law, which states that doctors may provide abortions in the case of an ectopic pregnancy or if a pregnant patient's water breaks too early, rendering the fetus unviable.

On September 17, 2025, the Texas Senate passed House Bill 7, a law that bans the manufacture, distribution, and mailing of abortion medication. It authorizes private citizens to bring civil lawsuits against individuals or entities that violate these prohibitions. Such lawsuits may target doctors who prescribe abortion medication, companies that ship pills by mail, or third parties who order the drugs for someone else, even if they are located outside Texas, but not the pregnant patient. Each violation carries statutory damages of at least $100,000, in addition to legal fees and injunctive relief. It took effect on December 4, 2025.

=== Judicial history ===
In 1971, Norma McCorvey, then an unmarried pregnant woman who would later be known as Jane Roe, decided to challenge the Texas law that said it was a crime for doctors to perform elective abortions and that women could only have abortions if their lives were at stake. The US Supreme Court's decision in 1973's Roe v. Wade ruling meant the state could no longer regulate abortion in the first trimester. The Supreme Court overturned Roe v. Wade in Dobbs v. Jackson Women's Health Organization, No. 19-1392, 597 U.S. 215 (2022) in 2022.)

On February 19, 1975, the Texas Supreme Court's ruling in the case Jacobs v. Theimer made Texas the first state to declare a woman could sue her doctor for wrongful birth. That case involved Dortha Jean Jacobs(later Dortha Biggs), who caught rubella while pregnant and gave birth to Lesli, who was severely disabled. Dortha and her husband sued her doctor, saying he did not diagnose the rubella or warn them how it would affect the pregnancy.

Low-Income Women of Texas v. Raiford was filed in the Texas District Court on March 10, 1993, to challenge the Texas state constitutionality of denying state funding for abortions when a physician deems the abortion medically necessary.

In 2003, Norma McCorvey filed suit in the U.S. District Court in Dallas with the goal of overturning the Roe v. Wade decision in which she was a participant. In September 2004, a federal appeals court ruled on a Targeted Regulation of Abortion Providers (TRAP) law put into place in Texas law, which ultimately resulted in many abortion clinics in the state being forced to shut down.

On August 29, 2014, US District Judge Lee Yeakel struck down as unconstitutional two provisions of Texas' omnibus anti-abortion bill, House Bill 2 that was to come into effect on September 1.

In the case of Whole Woman's Health v. Hellerstedt, 579 U.S. 582 (2016), the US Supreme Court in a 5-3 decision on June 27, 2016, swept away forms of state restrictions on the way abortion clinics can function. In 2013 the Texas legislature enacted restrictions on the delivery of abortion services, creating an undue burden for women seeking an abortion by requiring abortion doctors to have difficult-to-obtain "admitting privileges" at a local hospital and by requiring clinics to have costly hospital-grade facilities. The Court struck down these two provisions "facially" from the law at issue—that is, the very words of the provisions were invalid, no matter how they might be applied in any practical situation. According to the Supreme Court, the task of judging whether a law puts an unconstitutional burden on a woman's right to abortion belongs with the courts, and not the legislatures.

In August 2018, dilation & evacuation (D & E) legislation passed by Texas and Alabama was working its way through the federal courts' appeal process.

The constitutionality of SB 8 (the Texas Heartbeat Act) is a matter of intense legal controversy. As of September 2021, several legal challenges were pending in state and federal courts. Whole Woman's Health and other abortion providers sought an emergency injunction from the U.S. Supreme Court to stop the law from coming into effect, but the Court denied the application. Although the order itself was unsigned, Chief Justice John Roberts wrote a dissenting opinion, joined by Justices Stephen Breyer and Elena Kagan, indicating that he would "preclude enforcement of S. B. 8 by the respondents to afford the District Court and the Court of Appeals the opportunity to consider the propriety of judicial action and preliminary relief pending consideration of the plaintiffs' claims." Justice Sonia Sotomayor also wrote a stinging dissent of her own.

On October 6, 2021, U.S. District Judge Robert L. Pitman enjoined Texas courts from participating in the enforcement of the law through private civil litigation on the theory that judges are agents of the state. However, on October 8, 2021, the U.S. Court of Appeals for the Fifth Circuit put the law in effect again.

In March 2023, five people sued Texas over its abortion restrictions. By November, the lawsuit had expanded to 20 plaintiffs.

In December 2023, Kate Cox, a pregnant woman in Texas, sued for access to an emergency abortion; this was the first publicized lawsuit of its kind in the United States in 50 years, since Roe v. Wade in 1973. With her fetus having trisomy 18; Cox's lawsuit stated that the diagnosis was that the fetus could die in her womb, or at most survive only days after birth. Cox's lawsuit also stated that if Cox's pregnancy continued, she risked gestational hypertension, gestational diabetes and uterine rupture. Texas judge Maya Guerra Gamble ruled that Cox qualified for an abortion under the medical exemption provision in Texas law, as "Cox's life, health, and fertility are currently at serious risk". Texas Attorney General Ken Paxton responded that Judge Gamble was an "activist" that was "not medically qualified" to make this ruling, threatened to prosecute doctors if they performed an abortion on Cox, and stated that Texas hospitals that allowed Cox's abortion could "be liable for negligent credentialing" the abortion-performing doctor. Paxton also appealed Gamble's ruling to the Texas Supreme Court, where his office argued: "A fatal fetal condition does not meet the medical exception". The Texas Supreme Court paused Gamble's ruling, leading to Cox leaving Texas to obtain an abortion; later the Texas Supreme Court unanimously ruled against Cox, ordering Judge Gamble's ruling reversed, stating that even though Cox's pregnancy was "extremely complicated", even "serious" pregnancy difficulties do not meet Texas' medical exemption provision. Cox's doctor's "good faith belief" that Cox needed an abortion was insufficient, ruled the Texas Supreme Court, instead the doctor was required to provide "reasonable medical judgment" that an abortion was needed.

In March 2024, a woman sued the Starr County, Texas district attorney after being improperly arrested and charged with murder for having an abortion in April 2022.

On May 31, 2024, the Texas Supreme Court issued a unanimous decision that upheld the three laws, with one plaintiff, Dr. Karsan, having the standing to sue the state government after being threatened by the attorney general, Ken Paxton. Two justices: Brett Busby and Debra Lehrmann, issued a concurring opinion that left the door open to a broader challenge to the law, but only to overturn it completely.

In August 2024, two Texas women filed federal complaints against Texas hospitals they say refused them treatment after losing their fallopian tubes and suffering permanent fertility damage when denied treatment for their ectopic pregnancies at Texas hospitals, despite the fact that Texas law allows doctors to terminate ectopic pregnancies.

In February 2025, a Texas judge ordered a New York doctor to pay penalties for prescribing abortion pills to a woman near Dallas. Texas filed the civil lawsuit in December 2024, alleging that Dr. Margaret Daley Carpenter violated Texas law by providing the drugs to a Texas patient. A county clerk in New York refused to file the civil judgment twice, citing the New York law that shields abortion providers who serve patients in states with abortion bans.

In 2026, a woman filed a federal complaint against two hospitals in Austin, Texas who refused to treat her miscarriage despite a serious infection.

In September 2026, the family of Tierra Walker filed a wrongful death lawsuit against Texas Attorney General Ken Paxton and others. Walker died at 37 years old in 2024 of complications from pre-eclampsia. The lawsuit alleges her doctors refused to perform an abortion even though her medical emergency qualified for an exception from Texas' abortion laws. It is the first lawsuit over a death linked to an abortion ban.

=== Funding history ===
As a result of Administrative Code tit. 25, § 29,1121 from January 1997, women in Texas cannot use any state funds for abortion services unless their life is in danger or the pregnancy is a result of rape. The US 1998 Department of Labor Appropriations Act Pub. L. No 105.78, Title V, §§ 509, 510 was a federal law that barred states who participated in Medicaid from refusing to use federal funds to pay abortions in cases of pregnancy as a result of rape or incest, or when continuing the pregnancy would harm a woman's health.

In 2005 the 79th Legislature enacted several laws related to abortion. One put funding restrictions on family planning clinics as part of legislative efforts to force Planned Parenthood clinics in the state to close. Texas created a state-funded program Alternatives to Abortion Program. Funds for the program came from existing programs designed to support family planning. Additional funding was allocated for the Alternatives to Abortion Program in 2007.

The state legislature continued in its effort to deny funding to Planned Parenthood in 2009. These efforts failed. Another attempt to pass mandatory ultrasounds before women could get abortions also failed. Efforts by lawmakers to try to get Planned Parenthood out of the state continued in 2010. These efforts were successful in defining all Planned Parenthood clinics as abortion clinics, even if a clinic did not perform abortions and only offered family planning services. This was intended to deny Planned Parenthood funding to clinics that didn't provide abortion services. In 2010, the state had three publicly funded abortion clinics, none of which were state-funded.

In 2011, Texas was one of six states where the legislature introduced a bill that would have banned abortion in almost all cases. It did not pass. In 2011, the state legislature voted to defund family planning funding, including for the Women's Health Program; these programs were replaced by state-funded abortion alternative programs that only provided limited contraceptive supplies. That year, the state also successfully passed a law requiring mandatory ultrasound screenings before women could get abortions. In practice, this led to Planned Parenthood being unable to receive any Title X funding.

The Alternatives to Abortion-supported clinics, many of which have religious affiliations, have not always fared well despite receiving hundreds of thousands of dollars in grants from the state of Texas. Heidi Clinic, run by the Heidi Group, is one such clinic. It opened in April 2018, and staff members engaged in daily prayers while materials around the facility encouraged people to read the Bible and to pray more. It was closed in September 2018 as the clinic served only 5% of the total number of patients they had predicted they would serve. The Heidi Clinic had promised the state they could serve 69,000 people, including men and undocumented immigrants, with their reproductive health services. This was more than the local Planned Parenthood clinic served. The state had several years of documentation showing that the Heidi Group violated contracts and misused taxpayer dollars during a period when the state was funding them and similar organizations. Despite these problems, the State of Texas renewed the contract with the Heidi Group for two additional years. The state was only able to recover a portion of the funding it had allocated to the group for services it failed to provide.

In September 2019, the City of Austin amended its 2020 budget to include $150,000 in funds to support logistical and support services for abortion access. These services could include child care, case management, and transportation needs. The amendment passed with a 10–1 majority supporting the measure, including Mayor Pro Tem Delia Garza who introduced the measure. This was the first measure passed in any U.S. city offering practical support for abortion. A legal challenge to the local policy made its way to the Texas Supreme Court.

=== Clinic history ===
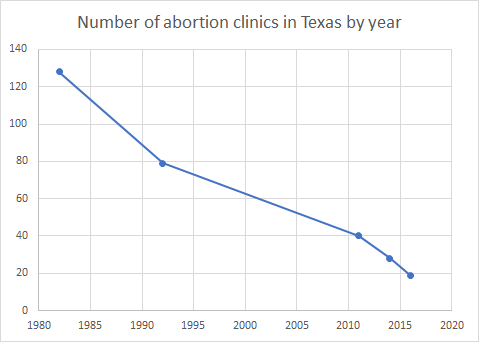
Number of abortion clinics in Texas by year.

Between 1982 and 1992, the number of abortion clinics in Texas declined by 49, going from 128 in 1982 to 79 in 1992. During a six-year stretch in the 1980s, Carol Everett ran a number of abortion clinics in Austin; she later shuttered these after she had a "come to Jesus" moment.

The state ranked sixth in the total number of abortion clinics lost between 1992 and 1996, dropping by 15 to 64 total clinics. The rate of closures of abortion clinics in Texas increased as more clinics were forced to close because of increased regulatory requirements. In a one-year period, in 2011, 85 abortion clinics closed. Between 2012 and 2016 the number of abortion clinics in Texas dropped from 40 to 19 as a result of the state's House Bill 2, which was struck down by the US Supreme Court in June 2016. After TRAP laws came into effect in Missouri and Texas, women had to travel even greater distances to be able to visit an abortion clinic.

By 2014, there were 28 abortion clinics in the state and 96% of the counties in the state did not have an abortion clinic. That year, 43% of women in the state aged 15 – 44 lived in a county without an abortion clinic. As a result of TRAP legislation passed in 2014, several more abortion clinics in Texas were forced to close. In 2017, there were 35 Planned Parenthood clinics, six of which offered abortion services, in a state with a population of 6,621,207 women aged 15–49. Southwestern Women's Options was one of the abortion clinics open in 2019. A 2019 study found that TRAP laws increased the number of second-trimester abortions by restricting women's access to abortion services.

The passage of legislation regarding local government's ability to do business with abortion service providers on June 7, 2019, impacted Planned Parenthood in East Austin. This was because East Austin had signed a 20-year lease agreement in November 2018 with Planned Parenthood, with the rent being $1 a month. The East Austin clinic was impacted even though it provided no abortion services because its parent organization, Planned Parenthood, did offer such services.

As of 2022, there are no abortion providers offering services in Texas as a result of HB 1280.

In 2025, Planned Parenthood Gulf Coast announced it would cease operations due to funding cuts. Consequently, it was forced to close two clinics in Texas and two in Louisiana.

== Statistics ==
In the period between 1972 and 1974, Texas had the highest illegal abortion death rate in the United States with a rate of 62 deaths per million live births. In the same period, Texas and New York State had the largest number of illegal abortion deaths. Texas recorded 14 deaths in this period while New York had 11 in a period where 63 deaths from illegal abortions were reported nationwide. In 1972, Texas had eight illegal abortion deaths. In 1973, it had five. In 1974, the state recorded one illegal abortion death. In 1990, 2,041,000 women in Texas faced the risk of unintended pregnancy.

The highest number of legal induced abortions by the state in 2000 occurred in New York City with 94,466, while Florida was second with 88,563, and Texas was third with 76,121. In 2001, New York City had the highest number of induced abortions with 91,792, while Florida was second with 85,589, and Texas was third with 77,409. In 2003, the state of New York had the highest number of legal induced abortions with 90,820. Florida was second with 88,247, while Texas was third with 79,166.

In 2012, 73.2% of all abortions were performed in the first trimester, at or before eight weeks. 12.2% of all abortions were performed during week 9 or 10. 1.2% of all abortions occurred between week 17 and week 21. Only 0.5% of abortions occurred after week 21. Most abortions performed in 2012 were done at abortion clinics, accounting for 78.4% of all abortions. The rest were performed either at out-of-state facilities, by physician officers, hospitals or ambulatory surgery centers. The majority of abortions performed in 2012 on Texas residents used the suction aspiration method, accounting for 65.6% of all abortions. The next most common procedure was a medical-non-surgical procedure, accounting for 27.7% of all abortions for Texas residents. The third most common procedure was dilation and evacuation, accounting for 6.6% of abortion procedures.

In 2013, among white women aged 15–19, there were 2,020 abortions, 1,810 abortions for black women aged 15–19, 3,150 abortions for Hispanic women aged 15–19, and 400 abortions for women of all other races.

Public opinion on abortion is divided. In 2014, a poll by the Pew Research Center found that 50% of adults said abortion should be illegal in all or most cases while 45% said it should be legal. The 2023 American Values Atlas reported that, in their most recent survey, 56% of Texans said that abortion should be legal in all or most cases. In 2017, the state had an infant mortality rate of 5.9 deaths per 1,000 live births.

The teen birthrate in Texas rose for the first time in 15 years in 2022 following Texas' abortion ban, reversing an effort over the past 30 years to decrease teen pregnancies. 84% of the increased births were Latina teens.

Texas saw an estimated 26,313 rape-related pregnancies during the 16 months after the state outlawed all abortions in 2022, with no exceptions for survivors of rape or incest.

In the year following the overturn of Roe v. Wade in 2022, 210 pregnant women in a dozen states were criminally charged for conduct associated with their pregnancy, pregnancy loss or birth. Six states — Alabama, Mississippi, Ohio, Oklahoma, South Carolina and Texas — accounted for most cases. In 2025, a woman from San Antonio, Texas was released from jail and charges against her were dropped after serving five months while police investigated her miscarriage that occurred in the bathroom of a fast food restaurant.

In the first half of 2023, 105 minors under the age of 17 had to leave Texas to get abortions in other states. 6 of these minors were children under the age of 11.

Number, rate, and ratio of reported abortions, by reporting area of residence and occurrence and by percentage of abortions obtained by out-of-state residents, US CDC estimates
| Location | Residence | | | Occurrence | | | % obtained by out-of-state residents | Year | Ref |
|---|---|---|---|---|---|---|---|---|---|
| Location | No. | Rate^ | Ratio^^ | No. | Rate^ | Ratio^^ | % obtained by out-of-state residents | Year | Ref |
| Texas | | | | 97,400 | 23.1 | | | 1992 | |
| Texas | | | | 89,240 | 20.5 | | | 1995 | |
| Texas | | | | 91,270 | 20.7 | | | 1996 | |
| Texas | 70,003 | | | | 13.0 | 185.5 | | 2011 | |
| Texas | 66,098 | | | 68,298 | 12.1 | 172.8 | | 2012 | |
| Texas | 54,401 | 9.6 | 136 | 54,148 | 9.6 | 135 | 1.9 | 2014 | |
| Texas | 54,194 | 9.4 | 134 | 53,940 | 9.4 | 134 | 1.8 | 2015 | |
| Texas | 53,567 | 9.2 | 135 | 53,481 | 9.2 | 134 | 2.1 | 2016 | |
^number of abortions per 1,000 women aged 15–44; ^^number of abortions per 1,000 live births

Number of abortions for Texas residents by race and year
| County | Total | Asian | Hispanic | White | Black | Native American | Other | Unknown | Year | ref |
|---|---|---|---|---|---|---|---|---|---|---|
| Texas | 77,811 | 3,238 | 28,721 | 26,677 | 18,235 | 237 | 442 | 261 | 2007 | |
| Texas | 78,330 | 3,181 | 29,320 | 25,047 | 19,708 | 174 | 557 | 343 | 2008 | |
| Texas | 74,835 | 3,184 | 28,327 | 23,595 | 18,570 | 139 | 534 | 486 | 2009 | |
| Texas | 74,959 | 3,345 | 28,817 | 22,651 | 18,623 | 112 | 729 | 682 | 2010 | |
| Texas | 70,003 | 3,110 | 26,392 | 21,645 | 17,336 | 124 | 721 | 675 | 2011 | |
| Texas | 66,098 | 3,023 | 24,800 | 19,986 | 16,545 | 104 | 1,030 | 610 | 2012 | |
| Texas | 61,912 | 2,850 | 24,063 | 16,969 | 15,719 | 194 | 2,062 | 55 | 2013 | |
| Texas | 53,882 | 2,845 | 19,654 | 15,833 | 14,515 | 143 | 632 | 260 | 2014 | |
| Texas | 55,287 | 3,051 | 20,591 | 16,203 | 14,398 | 150 | 567 | 327 | 2015 | |

Number of abortions in Texas based on facility type and procedure
| Procedure | Total | Abortion Clinic | Physician's office | Hospital | Ambulatory Surgery | Other / Unknown | Year | ref |
|---|---|---|---|---|---|---|---|---|
| Vacuum aspiration | 61,824 | 58,507 | 98 | 30 | 3,063 | 126 | 2007 | |
| Non-surgical medication induced | 14,328 | 12,751 | 6 | 132 | 1,426 | 13 | 2007 | |
| Dilation and evacuation | 4,711 | 2,968 | 0 | 26 | 1,673 | 44 | 2007 | |
| Intrauterine | 10 | 0 | 0 | 10 | 0 | 0 | 2007 | |
| Dilation and curettage | 117 | 53 | 0 | 44 | 19 | 1 | 2007 | |
| Hysterotomy/Hysterectomy | 4 | 0 | 0 | 3 | 0 | 1 | 2007 | |
| Other / Unknown | 85 | 55 | 0 | 14 | 8 | 8 | 2007 | |
| Total | 81,079 | 74,334 | 104 | 259 | 6,189 | 193 | 2007 | |
| Vacuum aspiration | 60,371 | 56,761 | 101 | 23 | 3,350 | 136 | 2008 | |
| Non-surgical medication induced | 16,560 | 15,139 | 4 | 71 | 1,333 | 13 | 2008 | |
| Dilation and evacuation | 4,460 | 2,598 | 0 | 25 | 1,800 | 37 | 2008 | |
| Intrauterine | 3 | 1 | 0 | 2 | 0 | 0 | 2008 | |
| Dilation and curettage | 45 | 19 | 0 | 8 | 3 | 15 | 2008 | |
| Hysterotomy/Hysterectomy | 4 | 2 | 0 | 2 | 0 | 0 | 2008 | |
| Other / Unknown | 148 | 101 | 2 | 4 | 17 | 24 | 2008 | |
| Total | 81,591 | 74,621 | 107 | 135 | 6,503 | 225 | 2008 | |
| Vacuum aspiration | 57,454 | 54,880 | 36 | 19 | 2,393 | 126 | 2009 | |
| Non-surgical medication induced | 16,009 | 14,842 | 4 | 94 | 1,052 | 17 | 2009 | |
| Dilation and evacuation | 4,298 | 2,998 | 0 | 34 | 1,204 | 62 | 2009 | |
| Intrauterine | 4 | 0 | 0 | 4 | 0 | 0 | 2009 | |
| Dilation and curettage | 29 | 15 | 0 | 9 | 3 | 2 | 2009 | |
| Hysterotomy/Hysterectomy | 2 | 0 | 0 | 2 | 0 | 0 | 2009 | |
| Other / Unknown | 54 | 18 | 0 | 23 | 0 | 13 | 2009 | |
| Total | 77,850 | 72,753 | 40 | 185 | 4,652 | 220 | 2009 | |
| Vacuum aspiration | 54,476 | 47,408 | 60 | 13 | 6,938 | 57 | 2010 | |
| Non-surgical medication induced | 19,195 | 17,673 | 0 | 114 | 1,392 | 16 | 2010 | |
| Dilation and evacuation | 3,846 | 2,294 | 0 | 29 | 1,490 | 33 | 2010 | |
| Intrauterine | 7 | 3 | 0 | 3 | 0 | 1 | 2010 | |
| Dilation and curettage | 40 | 7 | 0 | 21 | 0 | 12 | 2010 | |
| Hysterotomy/Hysterectomy | 1 | 0 | 0 | 1 | 0 | 0 | 2010 | |
| Other / Unknown | 27 | 11 | 0 | 5 | 1 | 1 | 2010 | |
| Vacuum aspiration | 49,008 | 37,187 | 35 | 29 | 11,688 | 69 | 2011 | |
| Non-surgical medication induced | 18,902 | 15,990 | 0 | 100 | 2,803 | 9 | 2011 | |
| Dilation and evacuation | 4,474 | 2,667 | 0 | 32 | 1,739 | 36 | 2011 | |
| Intrauterine | 4 | 0 | 0 | 4 | 0 | 0 | 2011 | |
| Dilation and curettage | 20 | 5 | 0 | 6 | 7 | 2 | 2011 | |
| Hysterotomy/Hysterectomy | 4 | 0 | 0 | 3 | 0 | 1 | 2011 | |
| Other / Unknown | 58 | 27 | 0 | 10 | 0 | 21 | 2011 | |
| Total | 72,470 | 55,876 | 35 | 184 | 16,237 | 138 | 2011 | |
| Vacuum aspiration | 44,577 | 34,574 | 43 | 53 | 9,864 | 43 | 2012 | |
| Non-surgical medication induced | 19,081 | 16,187 | 0 | 104 | 2,778 | 12 | 2012 | |
| Dilation and evacuation | 4,541 | 2,808 | 0 | 18 | 1,691 | 24 | 2012 | |
| Intra-Uterine | 3 | 0 | 0 | 3 | 0 | 0 | 2012 | |
| Dilation and curettage | 61 | 23 | 0 | 10 | 28 | 0 | 2012 | |
| Hysterotomy/Hysterectomy | 4 | 0 | 0 | 4 | 0 | 0 | 2012 | |
| Other/Unknown | 31 | 0 | 0 | 13 | 0 | 18 | 2012 | |
| Total | 68,298 | 53,592 | 43 | 205 | 14,361 | 97 | 2012 | |
| Vacuum aspiration | 42,512 | 32,073 | 41 | 8 | 9,809 | 581 | 2013 | |
| Non-surgical medication induced | 16,756 | 13,521 | 0 | 83 | 3,148 | 4 | 2013 | |
| Dilation and evacuation | 4,405 | 2,878 | 0 | 22 | 1,501 | 4 | 2013 | |
| Intrauterine | 4 | 0 | 0 | 4 | 0 | 0 | 2013 | |
| Dilation and curettage | 71 | 28 | 0 | 12 | 31 | 0 | 2013 | |
| Hysterotomy/Hysterectomy | 1 | 0 | 0 | 1 | 0 | 0 | 2013 | |
| Other/Unknown | 100 | 3 | 0 | 3 | 2 | 92 | 2013 | |
| Total | 63,849 | 48,503 | 41 | 133 | 14,491 | 681 | 2013 | |
| Vacuum aspiration | 45,685 | 30,948 | 46 | 10 | 14,057 | 624 | 2014 | |
| Non-surgical medication induced | 5,044 | 4,351 | 0 | 66 | 604 | 23 | 2014 | |
| Dilation and evacuation | 3,999 | 2,417 | 0 | 18 | 1,555 | 9 | 2014 | |
| Intrauterine | 4 | 0 | 0 | 1 | 2 | 1 | 2014 | |
| Dilation and curettage | 61 | 11 | 0 | 4 | 46 | 0 | 2014 | |
| Hysterotomy/Hysterectomy | 2 | 0 | 0 | 2 | 0 | 0 | 2014 | |
| Other / Unknown | 107 | 7 | 0 | 2 | 1 | 97 | 2014 | |
| Total | 54,902 | 37,734 | 46 | 103 | 16,265 | 754 | 2014 | |
| Vacuum aspiration | 43,823 | 22,191 | 45 | 34 | 21,212 | 341 | 2015 | |
| Non-surgical medication induced | 6,029 | 3,873 | 0 | 55 | 2,076 | 25 | 2015 | |
| Dilation and evacuation | 4,386 | 1,764 | 0 | 31 | 2,572 | 19 | 2015 | |
| Intrauterine | 3 | 1 | 0 | 1 | 0 | 1 | 2015 | |
| Dilation and curettage | 68 | 6 | 0 | 7 | 54 | 1 | 2015 | |
| Hysterotomy/Hysterectomy | 4 | 0 | 0 | 4 | 0 | 0 | 2015 | |
| Other / Unknown | 974 | 7 | 0 | 7 | 0 | 960 | 2015 | |
| Total | 55,287 | 27,842 | 45 | 139 | 25,914 | 1,347 | 2015 | |

== Illegal abortion deaths ==
Texas resident Rosie Jimenez is the first woman known to have died due to an illegal abortion after the Hyde Amendment was passed in 1977. Jimenez died at age 27 in 1977 following an illegal abortion in McAllen, Texas. At the time she was a single mother of a five-year-old daughter as well as a student who would have earned a teaching credential in six months.

== Post-Dobbs pregnancy related deaths ==
An analysis from the Gender Equity Policy Institute found that from 2019 to 2022, the rate of maternal mortality cases in Texas rose by 56%, compared with just 11% nationwide during the same time period. Within a year after Texas' abortion ban took effect in 2021, maternal mortality rose in all racial groups studied, according to the Institute. In 2022, some 2,200 infants died in Texas in 2022, representing an 11.5% increase in infant mortality. Some of this increase could be attributed to Texas' increase number of overall births, but obstetrician-gynecologists quoted by CNN also stated that the abortion ban played a major role, as the law forced women to carry high-risk pregnancies to term. A ProPublica study found that the rate of sepsis went up more than 50% for pregnant patients in Texas who had been hospitalized in their second trimester between 2021-2023.

On September 8, 2021, shortly after Texas' abortion ban went into effect, 28-year old Josseli Barnica of Houston, Texas died of sepsis after a Houston hospital refused to treat her miscarriage.

On July 10, 2022, 2 weeks after Roe v. Wade was overturned, 27-year old Yeni Glick of Luling, Texas died due to pregnancy related complications. Due to Texas' abortion ban, at no point during any of her more than five hospital visits was an abortion mentioned or recommended, despite its potential to increase her chances of survival.

On May 10, 2023, 26-year old Gabriella Gonzalez was murdered by her ex-boyfriend, 22-year old Harold Thompson, after she left Texas to get an abortion in Colorado.

On June 12, 2023, 35-year old Porsha Ngumezi died of a hemorrhage after a Houston hospital refused to treat her miscarriage.

On October 29, 2023, 18-year old Nevaeh Crain of Vidor, Texas died of sepsis after one emergency room diagnosed her with strep throat, a second emergency room screened her for sepsis, doctors determined that her six-month fetus had a heartbeat, and she was fine to leave. At the third hospital an obstetrician wanted two ultrasounds to "confirm fetal demise". Crain died hours later.

On December 30, 2024, 37-year old Tierra Walker of San Antonio, Texas died from complications of pre-eclampsia. None of the 90 physicians involved in her care mentioned or recommended an abortion, despite its potential to increase her chances of survival.

In 2024, at least 18 babies were abandoned in Texas, resulting in at least two deaths. The number of abandoned babies in Texas has more than doubled since 2014.

== Abortion rights views and activities ==
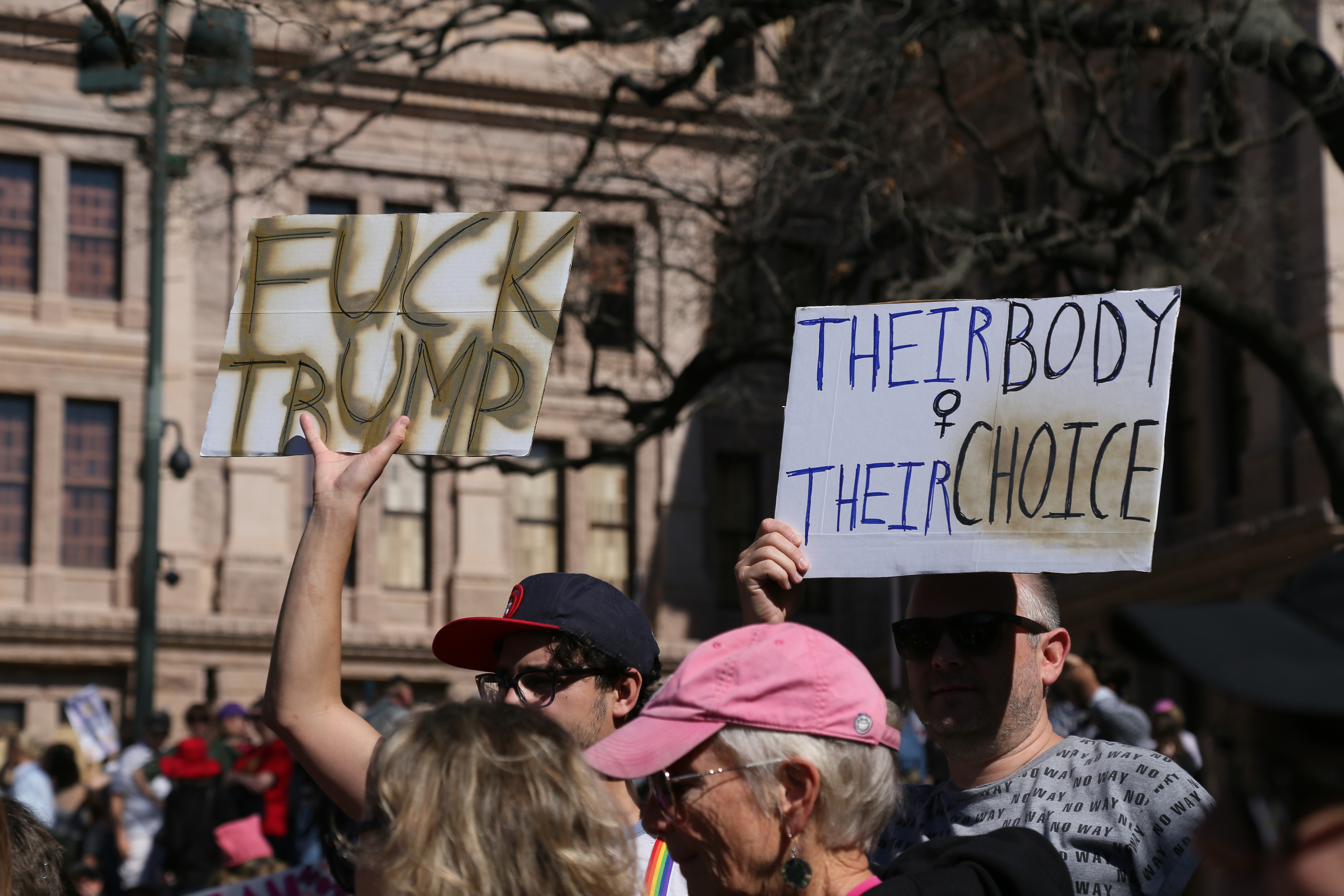
The Women's March in Austin, Texas, in 2017

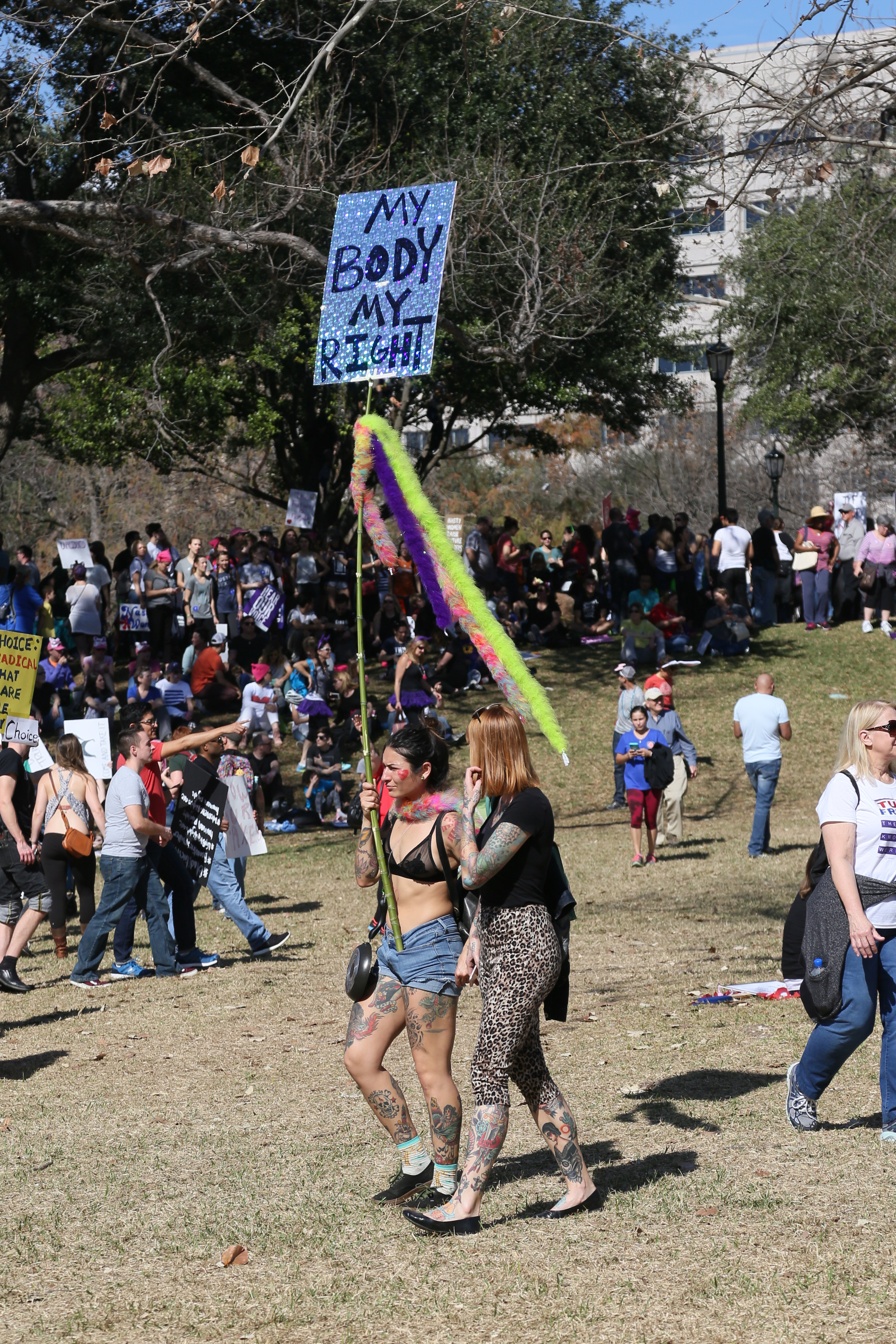
The Women's March in Austin, Texas, in 2017

=== Aid organizations ===
- Jane's Due Process is a Texas-based organization to assist minors going through the judicial-bypass process to secure an abortion without parental consent.
- Texas Equal Access provides financial aid to low-income residents.
- The National Latina Institute for Reproductive Justice
- Lilith Fund, based in Austin
- Frontera Fund, in the Rio Grande Valley
- Fund Texas Choice, in Dallas
- AVOW (previously NARAL Pro-Choice Texas)
- Clinic Access Support Network (CASN)
- We Testify
- Planned Parenthood Federation of America (PPFA) has eleven clinics in Texas.
- The Bridge Collective, in central Texas
- Plan C
- ACLU offers legal aid. represented the plaintiffs in the case to fight for abortion access in Texas, and it was one of the many groups that requested the Supreme Court block S.B. 8. While the abortion ban remains in effect, it is continuing to defend plaintiffs and fight to block the law.
- Buckle Bunnies Fund
- The Afiya Center (TAC), in North Texas
- West Fund, in El Paso

=== Activities ===
Since 1995, the Abortion Access Project has organized Rosie Jimenez Day every October 3. They also sponsor yearly speak-outs and other events in October in memory of Rosie Jimenez.

SXSW draws attention by using a billboard truck to showcase video messages and art about abortion rights. The truck is part of a series of events put together for South by Southwest (SXSW) by several pro-abortion rights organizations, including Plan C, Fight for the Future, Project for Empty Space and Women on Web.

The American Civil Liberties Union of Texas is partnering with reproductive rights and justice organizations and pro-abortion Texans to launch the Texas Abortion Advocacy Network (TAAN). This network will mobilize supporters to respond to local threats to reproductive health and actively work to restore and expand abortion access in Texas. The Texas Abortion Advocacy Network includes the ACLU of Texas, AFIYA Center, Frontera Fund, Planned Parenthood Texas Votes, Jane's Due Process, Avow, the Texas Equal Access Fund, Lilith Fund, Fund Texas Choice, and abortion advocates from across the state.

A federal judge granted a preliminary injunction in February, blocking a limited number of prosecutors from going after anyone who helps a Texan travel out of state to terminate a pregnancy. This has given some abortion funds confidence to resume operations.

FRONTERA FUND raises $10,000 for abortion access. The bake sale, they call it "Bake-A-Thon" is one of their many projects to raise money which resulted in $3,000. Due to COVID-19, they have since switched to contactless bake sales and have generated more money than ever, getting close to their $10,000 goal.

=== Protests ===
People from Texas participated in marches supporting abortion rights as part of a #StoptheBans movement in May 2019. On May 23, 2019, women gathered at the Texas State Capitol Rotunda in Austin to express opposition to SB8. They dressed in red costumes evoking characters in The Handmaid's Tale.

Following the overturn of Roe v. Wade on June 24, 2022, abortion rights protests were held in Austin, Dallas, Denton, Houston, and San Antonio.

In June 2024, Texas radio host Ryan Hamilton spoke out against Texas' abortion ban after his wife nearly bled to death after a Texas hospital refused to treat her miscarriage.

== Anti-abortion views and activities ==
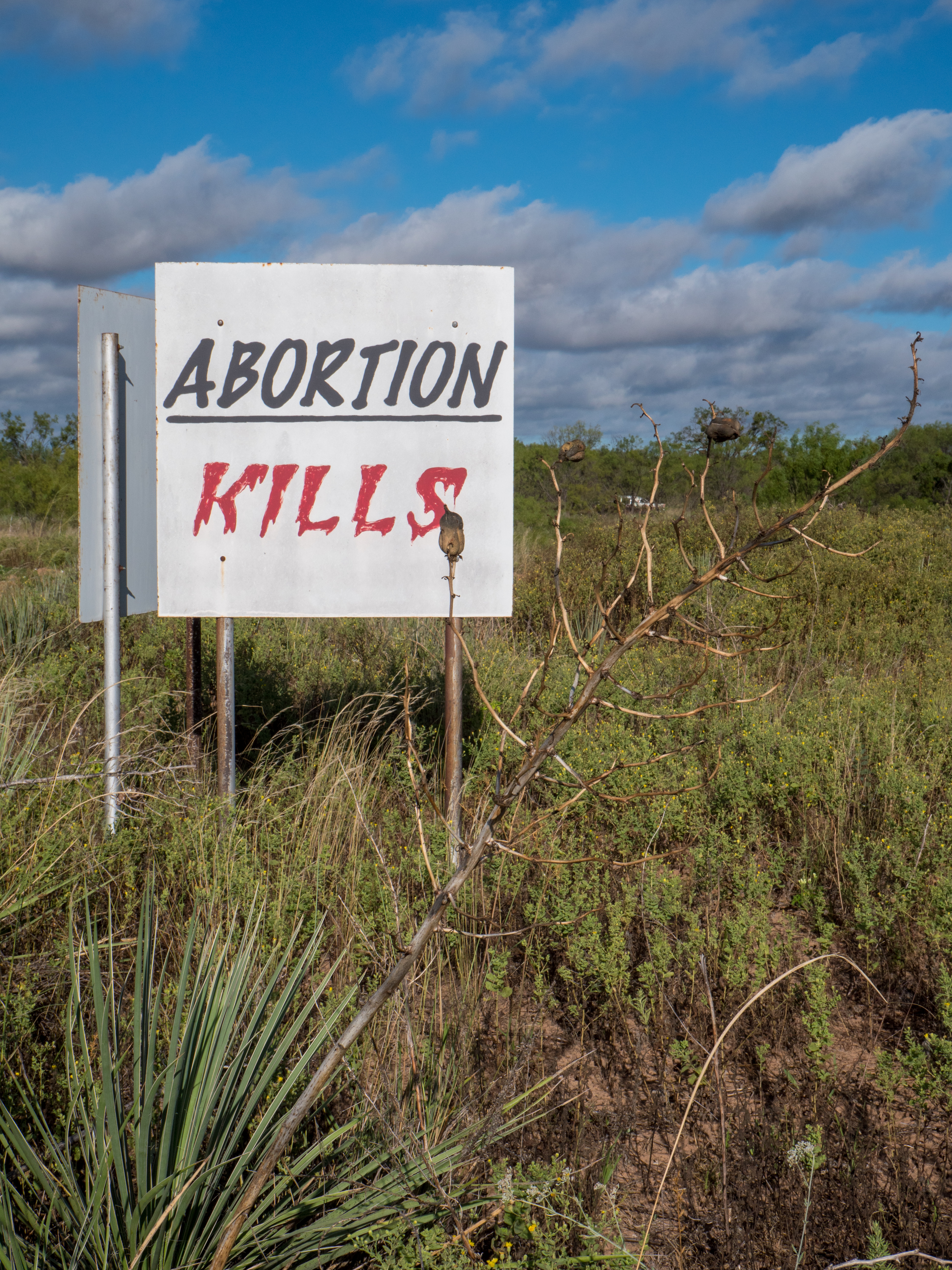
Pro-life roadside sign in Ballinger, Texas

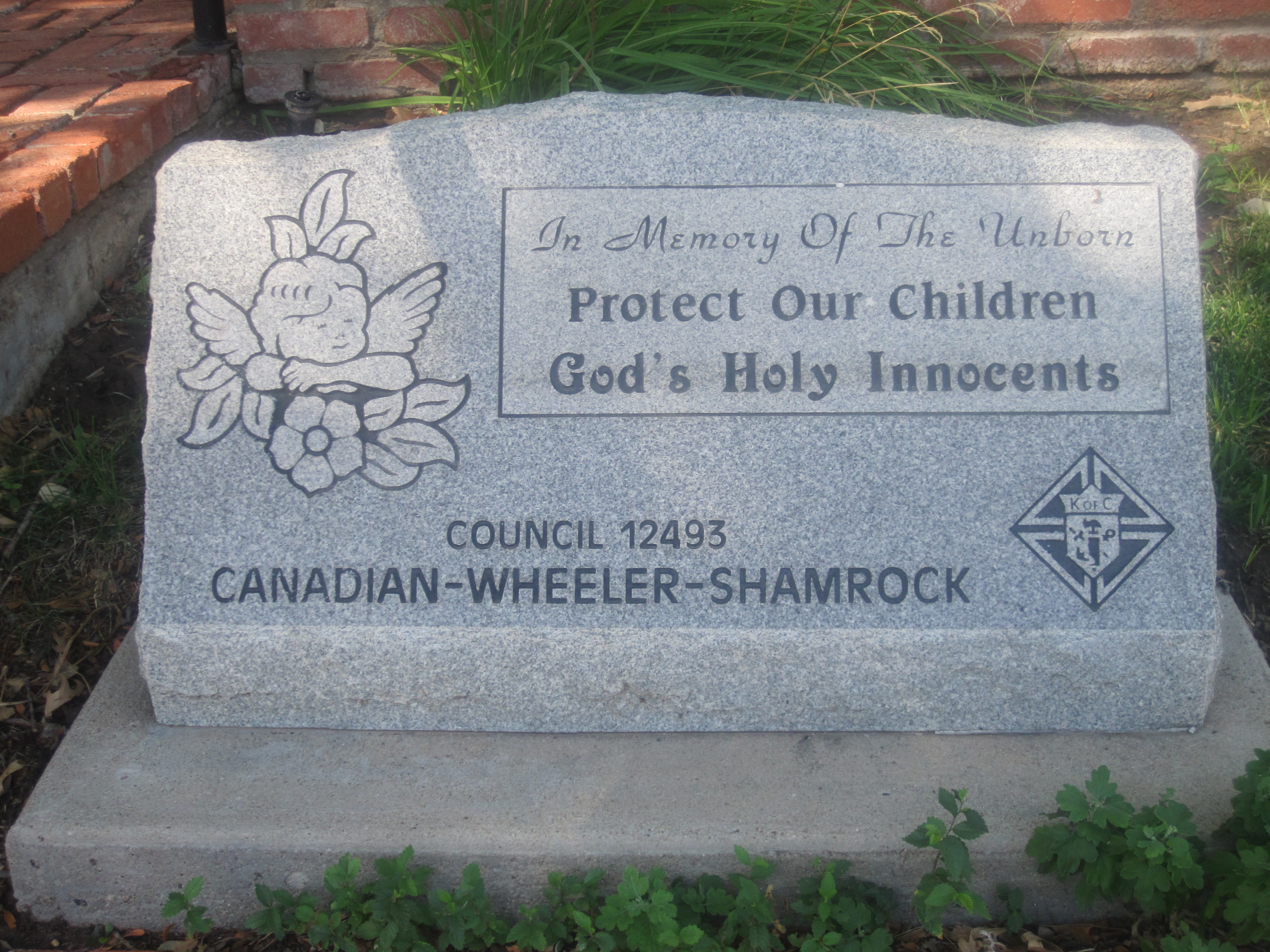
Monument to the unborn, Canadian, Texas, in 2010

=== Organizations ===
Texas has among the most crisis pregnancy centers of any state, and a Hechinger Report investigation identified more than 35 examples of these crisis pregnancy centers teaching sex education classes in dozens of school districts across Texas. Human Coalition is a Texas anti-abortion organization that operates crisis pregnancy centers. And crisis pregnancy centers, like the Pregnancy Center of the Coastal Bend in Corpus Christi, Texas, continue to expand post-Roe. Other pregnancy resource centers, like the Truth Pregnancy Resource Center that the First Unitarian Church of Dallas launched, seek to counter misinformation from crisis pregnancy centers.

In September 2023, Texas Attorney General Ken Paxton sued California-based company, Yelp Inc, over crisis pregnancy center labeling. The lawsuit came a day after Yelp preemptively sued Paxton in the Northern District of California arguing that the company's labeling of these centers as not offering abortion services were true, not misleading, and protected free speech. On March 1, 2024, a district court in Texas dismissed the lawsuit brought by Paxton's office.

In April 2021, the Texas Legislature approved $165 million over two years, more than double the 2019 budgeted amount, to fund the Alternatives to Abortion program (recently rebranded to Thriving Texas Families), servicing more than 100,000 pregnant women and parents in 2021 and contracting with several crisis pregnancy centers in the state.

=== Violence ===
There was an arson attack in 1980 at an abortion clinic in Texas. It caused around US $320,000 in damage.

On January 14, 1992, Dr. Douglas Karpen was wounded by gunshot at Women's Pavilion in Houston. The assailant was never caught.

1998 saw six arson attacks, four bombings, one murder and 19 acid attacks take place at abortion clinics across the United States. Butyric acid attacks took place between May and July in Florida, Louisiana and Texas.

In 2000, an act of violence took place at an abortion clinic in Eastland County, Texas.

Harris County, which includes Houston, has been home to the most anti-abortion violence in the United States as of 2000 with 10 acts of violence being experienced by clinics.

A package left at a women's health clinic in Austin, Texas, on April 25, 2007, contained an explosive device capable of inflicting serious injury or death. A bomb squad detonated the device after evacuating the building. Paul Ross Evans (who had a criminal record for armed robbery and theft) was found guilty of the crime.

== City ordinances ==
=== Anti-abortion ordinances ===
As of December 14, 2021, 39 cities in Texas had outlawed abortion within their city boundaries and declared themselves "sanctuary cities for the unborn." The first city to do so was the city of Waskom, Texas, which enacted its local abortion ban on June 13, 2019.

The city of Lubbock enacted its local abortion ban through a referendum on May 1, 2021. Planned Parenthood of Greater Texas was performing abortions in Lubbock when the ordinance was adopted and sued the city in an attempt to block the ordinance from taking effect. A federal district court dismissed the lawsuit on June 1, 2021, ruling that Planned Parenthood lacked standing to sue the city because the ordinance would be enforced solely through private civil lawsuits rather than by city officials. In response to this ruling, Planned Parenthood ceased performing abortions in Lubbock and complied with the ordinance.

=== Abortion de-prioritization ordinances ===
As of September 27, 2022, at least five cities in Texas have enacted resolutions instructing city officials to deprioritize enforcement of the state's abortion laws. The first city to do so was Houston, which enacted its de-prioritization resolution on May 10, 2022. The Denton City Council enacted a similar resolution a week after the Dobbs vs. Jackson decision, on June 29, 2022. On July 21, 2022, the state capital of Austin followed suit. On August 3, 2022, the cities of Dallas and El Paso also de-prioritizatized enforcement of the state's abortion laws. Despite these resolutions, abortion remains a criminal offense under state law and anyone violating the state's abortion laws in those cities is subject to criminal prosecution by the district attorney (a county official) and civil penalties imposed by the state attorney general.
