= Mark Dixon =

Mark Dixon may refer to:

- Mark Dixon (gridiron football) (born 1970), American football player
- Mark Dixon (businessman), English founder of Regus

== See also ==
- Mark Dickson (disambiguation)
