= Texas House Bill 7 =

2025 Texas law targeting abortion medication

House Bill 7

Texas Legislature
- Long title: AN ACT relating to prohibitions on the manufacture and provision of abortion-inducing drugs, including the jurisdiction of and effect of certain judgments by courts within and outside this state with respect to the manufacture and provision of those drugs, and to protections from certain counteractions under the laws of other states and jurisdictions; authorizing qui tam actions.
- Territorial extent: Texas
- Passed by: Texas House of Representatives
- Passed: August 28, 2025
- Passed by: Texas Senate
- Passed: September 3, 2025
- Signed by: Greg Abbott
- Signed: September 17, 2025
- Effective: December 4, 2025; 3 months ago

Legislative history

Initiating chamber: Texas House of Representatives
- Bill title: House Bill 7
- Introduced: August 20, 2025
- First reading: August 20, 2025
- Second reading: August 28, 2025
- Third reading: August 28, 2025
- Voting summary: 82 voted for; 48 voted against; 3 present not voting

Revising chamber: Texas Senate
- Received from the Texas House of Representatives: September 2, 2025
- First reading: September 2, 2025
- Second reading: September 2, 2025
- Third reading: September 3, 2025
- Voting summary: 17 voted for; 8 voted against; 1 present not voting

Summary
- Prohibits the production and distribution of abortion medication in Texas, with narrow exceptions, and provides for lawsuits by citizens for damages.
- Status: In force

Texas House Bill 7 (HB 7) is a 2025 law in the state of Texas that allows private citizens to sue manufacturers and distributors of abortion pills to and from Texas for damages targeting shield laws passed in other states which prevent the enforcement of out-of-state laws regarding abortion care, nullifying them as a defense in Texas courts.

== Background ==
After the overturning of Roe v. Wade, a six-week abortion ban came into effect in Texas. Senate Bill 8, also known as the Heartbeat Act, became law in 2021 and prohibits abortions in the state if a heartbeat is detected unless the doctor reasonably believes there is a medical emergency requiring the removal of the fetus. Studies following the overturning of Roe v. Wade found that the abortion rate across the United States increased relative to before.

"Telehealth abortions" were still technically legal in Texas because of shield laws in other states such as New York, who could send abortion pills to patients in Texas from other states without the threat of legal action. Abortion pills are approved by the FDA to be used up to the tenth week of pregnancy.

== Provisions ==
House Bill 7 permits private citizens in Texas to sue the manufacturers and distributors of abortion pills in the state for damages. If their lawsuit is successful, the minimum in damages is $100,000. If the plaintiff is not directly related to the affected fetus but is still successful, they are entitled to 10% of the damages, with the rest going to charity. Women who are administered such care cannot be targeted or sued, only the manufacturers and distributors. Doctors cannot be sued for administering such care as well.

Because the bill gives enforcement to private citizens and not the state itself, the state cannot be directly taken to court over enforcement of the law. Appeals related to the law are sent to the 15th Court of Appeals.

== Reactions ==
=== Support ===
Texas Right to Life, a political lobby in the state, endorsed House Bill 7. Lieutenant Governor Dan Patrick congratulated state senator Bryan Hughes on the passage of House Bill 7.

=== Opposition ===
The American Civil Liberties Union publicly opposed House Bill 7. Texas House Democrats released a joint statement criticizing the bill after its passage. The Texas Hospital Association and the Texas Medical Association also opposed the law because its previous form could have been used to target medical professionals or hospitals, resulting in an amendment specifically exempting doctors and hospitals.

== See also ==
- Abortion in Texas
- Texas Heartbeat Act
