= First Unitarian Church of Dallas =

Unitarian Universalist church in Dallas

Coordinates: 32°50′21.0″N 96°48′14.5″W

- Formation: 1899
- Website: dallasuu.org

The First Unitarian Church of Dallas is a Unitarian Universalist congregation located in Dallas, Texas. It was established in 1899. The church has a history of social justice advocacy and has gained significant media attention in recent years for its role in supporting abortion access in Texas.

== History and architecture ==
The First Unitarian Church of Dallas was founded in 1899. Early in its history, the congregation faced challenges in finding a welcoming space, reportedly meeting initially at Temple Emanu-El due to other local churches' reluctance to host them.

The church's campus includes a building designed by architect Harwell Hamilton Harris, completed in 1950. Harris described his design as "a clearing in the forest," intended as a place of renewal within the city. In 2022, the church underwent a significant expansion that included new facilities. This project received an Award of Merit in the Cultural/Worship category from Engineering News-Record (ENR).

== Social justice advocacy ==
The First Unitarian Church of Dallas has a long-standing involvement with social justice, often taking progressive stances on civil rights.

- Racial integration: The church was an early adopter of racial integration in Texas. In the 1940s, under the leadership of Rev. Robert Raible, the church welcomed Black members, a decision that was seen as "groundbreaking" in the Dallas community at the time. Raible also became a vocal advocate for school desegregation, publicly criticizing the Dallas school board's delays.
- Civil rights movement: In the 1960s, the church provided a meeting place for civil rights organizations, including the Student Nonviolent Coordinating Committee (SNCC). Ministers from the church participated in the Selma to Montgomery marches, aligning with Dr. Martin Luther King Jr.'s efforts.
- LGBTQ+ rights: The congregation was one of the earliest churches in the United States to declare itself a welcoming and affirming community for lesbian, gay, and transgender individuals, beginning in the early 1970s. This commitment continued through the AIDS crisis, during which the church reportedly offered communion to Catholic gay men in its sanctuary.
- Interfaith cooperation: In the early 1970s, the church provided its library facilities to one of the area's first Muslim groups for prayer.

=== Abortion rights ===
In the 1960s, some members of the congregation assisted women seeking abortions by referring them to a doctor in East Texas, who performed the procedure illegally.

In 1969, the church began holding study groups about women and their roles in society. These meetings included discussions of reproductive rights and abortion, with the church inviting "members of Planned Parenthood, doctors and lawyers". Although early on members felt "conservatively" about abortion, they quickly became "passionate" about access to abortion. In 1970, the church's women's group met with Linda Coffee and Sarah Weddington. When the pair later filed Roe v. Wade, the women's group submitted "a key legal brief in support of reproductive choice" in support of the case. Prior to the decision, the church also organized trips to Texas' capital, Austin, to advocate for the repeal of anti-abortion legislation.

It was the first organization to join the Just Texas Reproductive Freedom Congregation movement, which launched in August 2021.

Following the 2022 overturning of Roe v. Wade, which eliminated the constitutional right to abortion, the First Unitarian Church of Dallas became an advocate for abortion access in Texas, a state with highly restrictive laws. The church's senior minister, Rev. Daniel Kanter, has publicly affirmed the church's moral imperative to support reproductive rights. The church is involved with the Clergy Consultation Service (CCS), a statewide initiative that assists Texans seeking abortion care, including facilitating travel to states where abortion remains legal, such as New Mexico. The church's actions are part of a broader movement among some faith leaders who frame abortion access as an issue of religious freedom and compassionate care.

In April 2024, the church opened the Truth Pregnancy Resource Center in Dallas, which offers "sonograms, pregnancy tests, and resources for adoption," as well as "information on contraceptives and out-of-state abortion resources". It was opened in part to counter crisis pregnancy centers, which aim to dissuade abortions.

== Notable people ==
- Robert Raible (1899–1983): Served as minister from 1942 to 1971. Raible was a significant figure in the church's early integration efforts and a vocal advocate for civil rights. His sermons on school desegregation garnered widespread media attention in Dallas.
- Laurel Hallman: Served as Senior Minister from 1987 to 2009, during a period described as "unprecedented growth" for the church.
- Daniel Kanter: Senior Minister since 2009, Kanter is known for his leadership in the church's contemporary social justice initiatives, particularly in the realm of reproductive rights.
