= Mark Lee Dickson =

American pastor and anti-abortion advocate (born 1985)

Mark Lee Dickson (born August 16, 1985) is an American pastor and anti-abortion advocate. Dickson has become one of the most influential anti-abortion voices in the United States due to his successful campaigning for cities to ban abortion through local "sanctuary city" ordinances.

== Early life ==
Dickson was brought up in Longview, Texas. As a child, Dickson would frequent the Gregg County Fair to visit his grandfather Glenn Canfield, Jr. at his booth for anti-abortion group Right To Life of East Texas. While at this booth Dickson was introduced to fetal models and would sometimes take a twelve-week fetal model home with him. After his grandfather's death of cancer in 2006, Dickson got involved with Right To Life of East Texas, later becoming a director with the organization.

Dickson had attended Kilgore College periodically but dropped out in order to pursue ministry work. In the meantime, he worked as a chaplain at a nursing home, as a pastor at a Baptist church, and as a security guard.

== Personal life ==
Dickson often bills himself as a “38-year-old virgin”. He has stated that he has had no personal experience with abortion, and that his battles with depression have helped him reflect on the value of life. He is known for wearing a backwards black baseball cap, a suit jacket, a button-down shirt, jeans, and a pair of Vans shoes.

Dickson is a supporter of former President Donald Trump, and believes that he won the 2020 election. He attended the "Save America" rally on January 6, 2021, but claims that he did not enter the Capitol.

He considers all abortions murder, with no exceptions.

== End-of-life advocacy ==
In 2018, Dickson became active on end-of-life issues as he worked with Wren and Karen Michel to prevent their 39-year-old son, Jonathan Michel, from being taken off of life support at a hospital in Tyler, Texas. In 2019 Dickson worked with Senator Bryan Hughes and Texas Right To Life on the case of 61-year old Carolyn Jones in Houston, Texas who was about to be removed from life support because of the Texas Advance Directives Act.

== Anti-abortion Efforts ==
Before 2019, Dickson frequently protested outside abortion clinics.

In 2019, the pastor launched his "sanctuary city" initiative. Concerned that an abortion clinic in Shreveport, Louisiana might cross the border and relocate to the small town of Waskom, Texas, he joined conservative attorney and former Solicitor General of Texas Jonathan F. Mitchell to draft legislation regarding sanctuary cities. The duo were able to convince the all-male city council to pass the legislation, rendering it the first municipality in the country to ban abortion.

Ever since his success in Waskom, Dickson has traveled all over Texas, lobbying towns and cities to ban abortion within city limits and become “sanctuary cities for the unborn”. At least 65 cities and two counties have passed "sanctuary city for the unborn" ordinances, including fifty cities in Texas, eight cities in Nebraska, two cities in Ohio, one city in Louisiana, one city in Iowa, and three cities and two counties in New Mexico. The largest city to have enacted one of Dickson's ordinances is Lubbock, Texas. Two cities, Omaha, Texas and Mason, Ohio, later retracted ordinances which Dickson had convinced them to enact.

Since the Supreme Court of the United States' decision in Dobbs v. Jackson Women's Health Organization, Dickson has been pushing for county and municipal anti-abortion ordinances in New Mexico, Colorado, Minnesota, Montana, and Arizona - in addition to states like Texas and Nebraska.

One major focus of Dickson's New Mexico efforts has been focused on preventing a reproductive healthcare clinic in Texas, Whole Woman's Health, from relocating to the nearby border town of Hobbs, New Mexico. The Hobbs City Commission passed one of Dickson's ordinances in November 2022. The action by the Hobbs City Commission immediately resulted in a condemnation from New Mexico Governor Michelle Lujan Grisham who criticized the measure as being authored by "out-of-state extremists." The ordinances passed in Hobbs and other jurisdictions throughout New Mexico utilize the Comstock Act of 1873 as part of their strategy.

In Colorado, Dickson attempted to thwart the opening of an abortion clinic operated by abortion provider LeRoy Carhart. While Dickson was successful in getting an ordinance introduced by the Pueblo, Colorado city council, the ordinance did not survive its final reading. Dickson and his allies were opposed at the council meeting by Daneya Esgar, who was just finishing her term as House Majority Leader and was the author of Colorado's Reproductive Health Equity Act (RHEA).

In June 2020, Dickson was sued by several abortion-assistance organizations for defamation for statements he made accusing abortion-aiding organizations of taking "part in the murder of innocent unborn human beings." In February, 2023, the Supreme Court of Texas unanimously sided in Dickson's favor - ruling against the three abortion-assistance organizations which had filed suit against him.

Dickson was also the sole non-government actor defendant in a federal lawsuit which challenged the Texas Heartbeat Act. All nine Supreme Court of the United States justices opined that the case against Dickson should be dismissed.

Dickson has been described as an “extremist” and " the primary face and architect” of the Texas Heartbeat Act by Kristin Ford, acting vice president of the pro-choice advocacy group NARAL.

Dickson serves as the Director of Right to Life of East Texas and is the Founder of Sanctuary Cities for the Unborn Initiative.
