= Texas Heartbeat Act =

2021 Act of the Texas Legislature on abortion

Texas Legislature
- Long title: An Act relating to abortion, including abortions after detection of an unborn child's heartbeat; authorizing a private civil right of action
- Passed by: Senate
- Passed: March 30, 2021
- Passed by: House of Representatives
- Passed: May 6, 2021
- Signed by: Governor Greg Abbott
- Signed: May 19, 2021
- Commenced: September 1, 2021

Legislative history

Initiating chamber: Senate
- Bill citation: Full Text of SB 8 with signatures of: Senate President Dan Patrick; House Speaker Dade Phelan; Secretary of State vacant; House Chief Clerk Robert Haney; Governor Greg Abbott
- Introduced by: Bryan Hughes (R–1)
- Passed: March 30, 2021
- Voting summary: 19 voted for; 12 voted against

Revising chamber: House of Representatives
- Passed: May 6, 2021
- Voting summary: 83 voted for; 64 voted against; 2 absent; 1 present not voting
- Status: Unknown

The Texas Heartbeat Act, Senate Bill 8 (SB 8), is an act of the Texas Legislature that bans abortion after the detection of embryonic or fetal cardiac activity, which normally occurs after about six weeks of pregnancy. The law took effect on September 1, 2021, after the U.S. Supreme Court denied a request for emergency relief from Texas abortion providers. It was the first time a state had successfully imposed a six-week abortion ban since Roe v. Wade, and the first abortion restriction to rely solely on enforcement by private individuals through civil lawsuits, rather than having state officials enforce the law with criminal or civil penalties. The act lets members of the public sue anyone who performs or helps carry out an illegal abortion for a minimum of $10,000 in statutory damages per abortion, plus court costs and attorneys' fees.

Since June 2022, SB 8 has been only one layer of a three-layer abortion ban in Texas. The U.S. Supreme Court's decision in Dobbs v. Jackson Women's Health Organization overturned Roe v. Wade that month, which let Texas's separate "trigger law" — a near-total ban on abortion from fertilization, with only narrow medical exceptions — take effect about a month later. Because of that, most abortions that once might have been stopped by SB 8's six-week rule are now blocked earlier and more completely by the trigger law, and criminal, not just civil, penalties can apply. SB 8 itself has not been repealed and remains in effect, so its private-lawsuit system is still legally available, and in September 2025 the Texas Legislature used that same private-lawsuit approach as the model for a new law restricting abortion pills (see below). Whether SB 8's core enforcement method — allowing lawsuits by people with no personal connection to the abortion — actually holds up under the Texas Constitution is still an open legal question, working its way through state courts as of mid-2026 (see below).

The Texas Heartbeat Act has been subjected to numerous lawsuits in state and federal court, but the statute has thus far withstood each of these court challenges and remains in effect. Lawsuits challenging the constitutionality of the Act have been filed by abortion providers and advocates, as well as the United States Department of Justice, but none of these lawsuits were able to restore access to post-heartbeat abortions in Texas while Roe was still the law of the land. The law was exceedingly difficult to challenge in court because of its unique enforcement mechanism, which bars state officials from enforcing the law and instead authorizes private individuals to sue anyone who performs or assists a post-heartbeat abortion. Because the law is enforced by private citizens rather than government officials, abortion providers were unable to obtain relief that would stop private lawsuits from being initiated against them. This produced an end-run around Roe v. Wade, because the threat of private civil-enforcement lawsuits forced abortion providers to comply with SB 8 even before the Supreme Court's own abortion precedents had changed.

Even when courts declared SB 8 unconstitutional, abortion providers remained in compliance with the Act because it purports to subject individuals to private civil-enforcement lawsuits if they perform or assist a post-heartbeat abortion while an injunction that blocks the law's enforcement is in effect, if that injunction is later vacated or reversed on appeal. On October 6, 2021, federal district Judge Robert L. Pitman issued a preliminary injunction that blocked the state of Texas from enforcing the law, which remained in effect until the U.S. Court of Appeals for the Fifth Circuit issued a stay of Pitman's order two days later. Yet Pitman's order was unable to fully restore access to post-heartbeat abortions in Texas, even during the 48-hour window in which it was in effect, because abortion providers were unwilling to risk the civil liability that would be imposed if Pitman's injunction were stayed or overturned by a higher court. The U.S. Supreme Court declined to overturn the Fifth Circuit's stay of Pitman's ruling, and, once Dobbs overturned Roe in June 2022, this line of litigation lost its purpose: there was no longer a federal constitutional right to abortion for SB 8 to conflict with, so the pre-enforcement federal challenge to SB 8 became moot.

The success of the Texas Heartbeat Act was a major blow to Roe v. Wade, as it provided a blueprint for states to outlaw abortion while insulating their laws from effective judicial review. This enabled the states to evade Roe v. Wade and other Supreme Court rulings that had declared abortion to be a constitutionally protected right, a right the Supreme Court itself eliminated in Dobbs a year later. SB 8's enforcement approach also led other states to copy its private-lawsuit mechanism to shield their own restrictive abortion laws from judicial review. On May 25, 2022, Oklahoma Governor Kevin Stitt signed HB 4327 into law, which outlaws abortion from the moment of fertilization. Because HB 4327, like the Texas Heartbeat Act, is enforced solely through civil lawsuits brought by private citizens, abortion providers were unable to stop the law in court and stopped performing abortions in Oklahoma, even before Roe was formally overturned. Idaho also enacted a six-week abortion ban modeled after the Texas Heartbeat Act, which likewise prevented abortion providers from challenging the law in federal court before it took effect. In 2025, Texas itself reused the same private-lawsuit model in a new law aimed at abortion pills, described below.

== Background ==
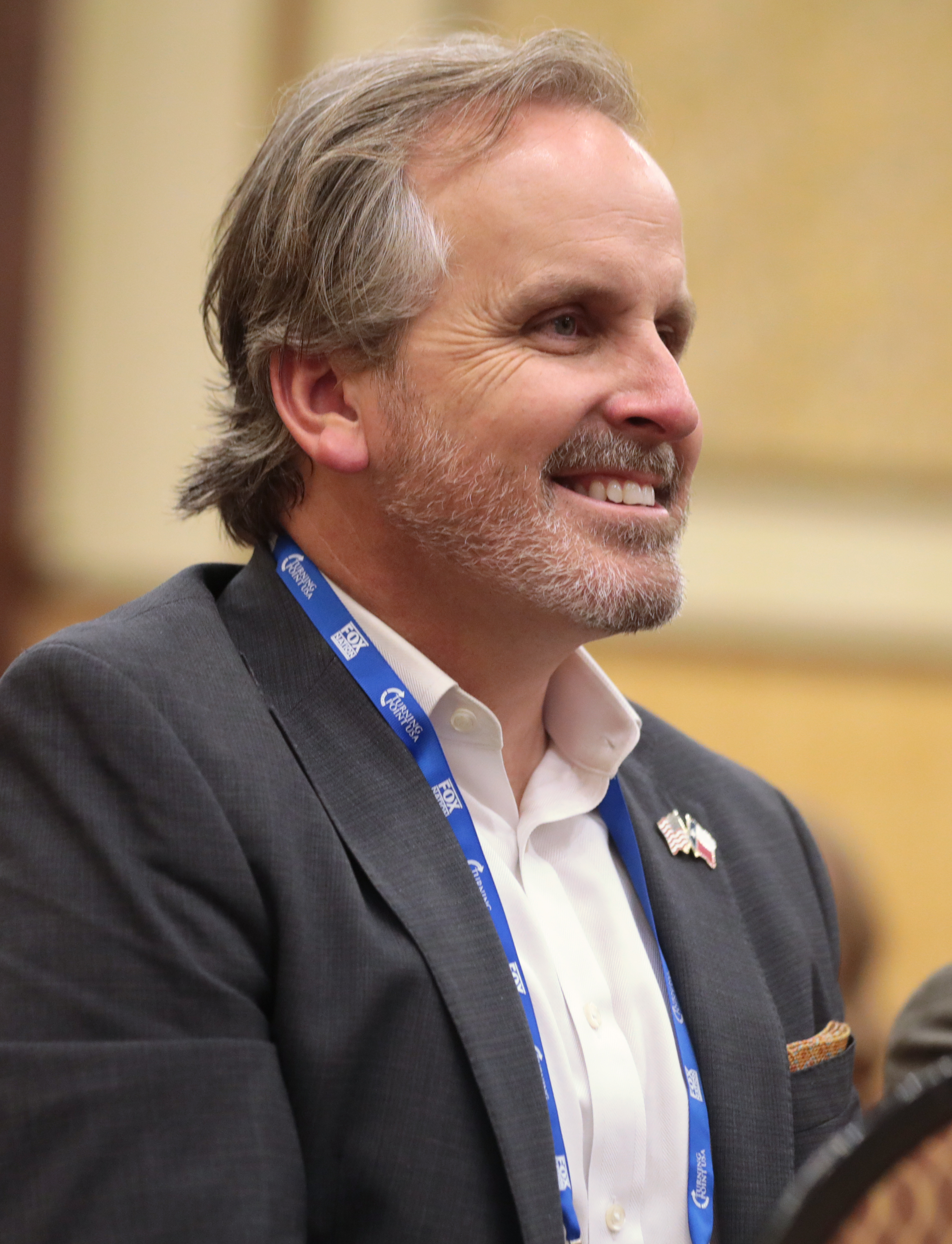
Texas Senator Bryan Hughes (R-Mineola) introduced and authored the Texas Heartbeat Act

A different six-week abortion ban, HB 59, was previously introduced in Texas by Representative Phil King on July 18, 2013. The bill did not pass. In 2019, another six-week abortion ban was introduced as HB 1500, which was jointly authored by Representatives Briscoe Cain, Phil King, the late Dan Flynn, Tan Parker, and Rick Miller. As of February 26, 2019, HB 1500 had 57 sponsors or cosponsors of the 150 members of the Texas House of Representatives. HB 1500, like HB 59, relied on conventional public enforcement by state officials, similar to laws that had been enacted in other states. HB 1500 did not pass.

On March 11, 2021, the Texas Heartbeat Bill (Senate Bill 8 or SB 8 for short) was introduced by Senator Bryan Hughes. A companion bill (HB 1515) was filed by Representative Shelby Slawson a day later in the Texas House of Representatives. Unlike HB 1500, SB 8 and HB 1515 contained a novel enforcement mechanism designed to shield the law from pre-enforcement judicial review. Each of the bills explicitly forbade state officials to enforce the law in any way, and instead authorized private individuals to sue those who perform or assist abortions after cardiac activity had been detected for $10,000 per abortion, plus costs and attorneys' fees. In structuring the law this way, the authors sought to shield it from judicial review in federal court, because lawsuits challenging the constitutionality of a state statute must be brought against state officials charged with enforcing the disputed law, rather than against the state itself. And without a state official who enforces the law, there is no one for abortion providers to sue pre-enforcement; they must instead wait to be sued in state court by a private individual and assert their constitutional claims as a defense to liability in those private civil-enforcement proceedings.

The private civil-enforcement feature of the law was engineered by former Stanford law professor Jonathan F. Mitchell. The idea was based on his 2018 Virginia Law Review article, "The Writ-of-Erasure Fallacy", which noted that laws enforced solely by private citizens are nearly impossible to challenge in pre-enforcement lawsuits. He later brought this idea to the attention of Mark Lee Dickson, an East Texas anti-abortion pastor, in 2019. Dickson was able to persuade the city council of Waskom, Texas, to enact an ordinance that outlawed abortion within city limits through the private civil-enforcement mechanism proposed by Mitchell, although it was mostly a symbolic move as the town had no abortion providers. Dickson then championed similar laws in other Texas towns and cities over the following years, including Lubbock, where a Planned Parenthood facility halted abortion procedures following passage of the local law. Mitchell helped Hughes draft the bill for the state based on the municipal ordinances he had written as a means of avoiding pre-enforcement judicial scrutiny, primarily by taking state officials out of enforcing the abortion ban and leaving enforcement entirely in the hands of private individuals.

The bill was a legislative priority of Republican lawmakers for the 2021 regular session, denoted 87(R). The Senate version was approved by both houses of the bicameral Texas legislature after the Senate concurred with House amendments. Texas governor Greg Abbott signed the bill on May 19, 2021, and it took effect on September 1, 2021.

== Provisions ==
The Texas Heartbeat Act contains twelve sections. Although the Act is best known for its provisions that outlaw abortion after cardiac activity has been detected, and that authorize private lawsuits against those who violate the Act, the Act includes other provisions that further restrict abortion and deter litigants from challenging abortion laws in court. It is regarded as one of the most aggressive and far-reaching pieces of anti-abortion legislation ever enacted, even though Texas's later trigger law went further still by banning abortion outright.

=== Section 2 ===
Section 2 of the Act declares that Texas has never repealed, either expressly or by implication, its pre–Roe v. Wade statutes that outlaw and criminalize abortion unless the mother's life is in danger. The Texas pre-Roe abortion laws are still codified at articles 4512.1 through 4512.6 of the Revised Civil Statutes, and they impose felony criminal liability on anyone who performs an elective abortion, as well as anyone who "furnishes the means for procuring an abortion knowing the purpose intended". The punishment is two to five years' imprisonment for each abortion performed or facilitated, and the statute of limitations is three years.

By declaring that the state's pre-Roe criminal abortion laws have never been repealed, section 2 overrules McCorvey v. Hill, a 2004 decision from the U.S. Court of Appeals for the Fifth Circuit, which held that Texas had implicitly repealed its pre-Roe criminal abortion statutes by enacting subsequent legislation that regulates the abortion procedure. It also ensures that all abortions performed in Texas—including abortions that occur before cardiac activity is detectable—are defined and regarded as criminal acts under Texas law. Since Dobbs overturned Roe in 2022, these older, pre-Roe statutes and Texas's new trigger law now operate alongside SB 8 rather than in its shadow, and prosecutors are no longer legally barred from relying on them.

The enactment of section 2 led Texas officials to threaten abortion funds and their donors with criminal prosecution under the state's pre-Roe abortion statutes. On March 18, 2022, Representative Briscoe Cain sent cease-and-desist letters to every abortion fund in Texas, demanding that they immediately stop paying for elective abortions performed in Texas. Cain warned that these abortion funds were violating the state's unrepealed pre-Roe abortion statutes by "furnishing the means for procuring an abortion knowing the purpose intended," and that every one of their employees, volunteers, and donors could face criminal prosecution. Abortion funds in Texas refused to halt their activities in response to Cain's letter.

=== Section 3 ===
Section 3 of the Act requires a physician to test for a "fetal heartbeat" (or "cardiac activity") before performing an abortion and prohibits abortion if a "fetal heartbeat" is detected. The only exception is for when "a physician believes a medical emergency exists that prevents compliance." The term "medical emergency" is not defined in the statute. Texas's separate, broader trigger law contains a similarly worded exception, and confusion over what counts as a qualifying medical emergency across both statutes became a major source of litigation after Dobbs (see below).

Section 3 includes a provision that specifically bans public enforcement of the law by state or local officials, and insists that the sole means of enforcement shall take place through civil-enforcement lawsuits brought by private individuals.

Section 3 also authorizes any private individual to sue anyone who performs or induces, or "aids and abets," a post-heartbeat abortion. Although the statute shields abortion patients from being named as defendants, anyone else who "aids or abets" an unlawful abortion can be sued in addition to the physician performing the procedure. That includes staff members at clinics, counselors, lawyers, financiers, and those who provide transportation to an abortion clinic, including drivers of a taxi or ride-hailing companies. The act encourages private enforcement by authorizing successful plaintiffs to collect "statutory damages" of "not less than $10,000" for each post-heartbeat abortion that the defendant performed or facilitated, in addition to court costs and attorney's fees if a defendant is found liable. Plaintiffs who bring these enforcement lawsuits are not required to have any personal connection to the patient or abortion provider.

Section 3 of the Act also insulates the state of Texas and its officials from being sued by preserving their sovereign immunity and forbidding them to enforce the statute in any way.

The Act allows defendants to escape liability if they demonstrate that the relief sought by the plaintiff will impose an "undue burden" on women seeking abortions. But the Act also provides that this "undue burden" defense would become unavailable if the Supreme Court ever overruled Roe v. Wade or Planned Parenthood v. Casey, even for an abortion that occurred while those decisions were still in effect. That is exactly what happened: once Dobbs overruled Roe and Casey in June 2022, this defense stopped being available, and it establishes a four-year statute of limitations. This subjects abortion providers and their enablers to liability for abortions performed while relying on Roe and Casey, even years earlier, and it deterred them from providing abortions even while those decisions were still on the books.

Finally, section 3 allows civil-enforcement lawsuits to be filed in the plaintiff's home county, raising the prospect that anyone who violates or assists a violation of SB 8 could be forced to defend themselves in any one of Texas's 254 counties, including deep-red counties where judges and juries would likely be hostile to abortion.

=== Section 4 ===
Section 4 of the Act requires litigants who challenge the constitutionality of any Texas abortion restriction to pay the attorneys' fees of "prevailing parties" if their challenge is unsuccessful. Section 4 also imposes joint and several liability on the attorneys and law firms that sue to enjoin the enforcement of any Texas abortion law.

At midnight, immediately after the law went into effect, many clinics in Texas including Planned Parenthood stopped performing abortion procedures and stopped taking new appointments. Many clinics reported an increase in patients who had completed the 24-hour waiting period and sought to have the procedure done before the midnight deadline.

The act contains exceptions in the case of medical emergency, such as if the mother is at risk of death or severe irreversible bodily harm. It makes no exceptions for rape or incest. Because enforcement of the law relies upon civil reporting, there are provisions that state no "perpetrator of an act of rape, sexual assault, incest, or any other act prohibited by Sections 22.011, 22.021, or 25.02, Penal Code" may be involved in the reporting process. On September 7, 2021, Governor Abbott asserted that the Act does not force raped women to carry pregnancies to term because the state would "work tirelessly to make sure that we eliminate all rapists from the streets of Texas." Texas's trigger law and the 2025 Life of the Mother Act described below also make no exception for rape or incest.

== 2025 legislative additions ==
By 2025, four years of practical experience with Texas's overlapping abortion bans — SB 8, the trigger law, and the pre-Roe statutes — had produced two separate problems lawmakers tried to address: doctors saying they were too afraid of the vague "medical emergency" language to treat patients who were seriously ill, and abortion pills continuing to reach Texans by mail from other states. The Legislature passed two significant new laws in 2025 responding to each problem. Neither one repeals or replaces SB 8; both build on top of it.

=== The Life of the Mother Act (clarifying the medical exception) ===
Reporting by ProPublica found that at least three Texas women had died after doctors delayed or declined abortion care during pregnancy emergencies, and that the rate of sepsis among pregnant Texans nearly doubled after the bans took effect, as doctors worried they could face criminal prosecution, loss of their medical license, and civil lawsuits if they misjudged whether a patient's condition was serious enough to qualify for the "medical emergency" exception.

In response, the Legislature passed companion bills — Senate Bill 31 and House Bill 44, both titled the "Life of the Mother Act" — with rare bipartisan support: the House passed its version 134–4, and the Senate passed its version unanimously. Rather than expanding who can legally get an abortion in Texas, the law is intended to give doctors more legal confidence to act. It drops the word "life-threatening," which had left doctors unsure whether it meant an immediate emergency or a risk that might develop later in the pregnancy, and instead makes clear that a doctor may act on "reasonable medical judgment" when a patient faces a risk to her life or a risk of substantial impairment to a major bodily function, without having to wait until she is closer to death. Governor Abbott signed the bill in late June 2025.

This bill amends Texas's broader Human and Life Protection framework (the trigger law) rather than SB 8's own text, but because SB 8 shares essentially the same undefined "medical emergency" language, the clarification is understood to apply across all of Texas's overlapping abortion restrictions, including SB 8.

=== The Woman and Child Protection Act (extending SB 8's private-lawsuit model to abortion pills) ===
On September 17, 2025, Governor Abbott signed House Bill 7, formally titled the Woman and Child Protection Act, which the Texas Legislature modeled directly on SB 8's enforcement design. Rather than banning a medical procedure performed in Texas, HB 7 targets the mailing of abortion-inducing drugs (mifepristone and misoprostol) to Texas residents, including from out-of-state doctors relying on other states' "shield laws" for legal protection.

Like SB 8, HB 7 bars Texas district attorneys and other state officials from enforcing it directly; instead it lets any private citizen sue, through what the bill calls a qui tam action, anyone who manufactures, distributes, mails, or prescribes abortion pills to someone in Texas. A winning plaintiff is entitled to at least $100,000 per violation; if the plaintiff has no personal connection to the pregnancy, they keep only 10 percent of that award and must donate the rest to a charity of their choosing. The law exempts pregnant women themselves from being sued, along with people miscarrying, internet and delivery companies that meet certain conditions, and emergency, ectopic-pregnancy, or miscarriage-related uses. It also tries to block "clawback" lawsuits that other states might bring against Texans for enforcing this law, and directs all appeals to Texas's centralized Fifteenth Court of Appeals. HB 7 took effect on December 4, 2025.

== Significance ==
The act was the first time since Roe v. Wade that a state successfully outlawed abortion as early as six weeks into a pregnancy, which is often shortly after a pregnant woman misses her menstrual period. Roughly 37% of people seeking abortion discover their pregnancy at six weeks or later, and around 60% of U.S. abortions are performed at six weeks or later.

The Texas Heartbeat Act is unique in that it was enforced exclusively through civil lawsuits brought by private citizens, rather than criminal or civil penalties imposed by state officials. This was engineered to deny abortion providers the opportunity to seek federal-court injunctions against the enforcement of the statute. Since the law could not be enforced by state officials but only by private individuals, it was difficult for abortion providers to identify the proper defendants to sue in a pre-enforcement lawsuit, which prevented them from challenging the constitutionality of the act before it took effect. As one commentator put it: "Abortion clinics are now in an impossible bind because on the one hand, there is no one to sue because no state official is allowed to enforce the law, while on the other hand, there are too many people to sue because they can't identify who among the millions of Texas pro-lifers will step forward to enforce the law."

In light of this feature in the law, U.S. Supreme Court Chief Justice John Roberts wrote that "the statutory scheme before the court is not only unusual, but unprecedented. The legislature has imposed a prohibition on abortions after roughly six weeks, and then essentially delegated enforcement of that prohibition to the populace at large."

A study produced by researchers at the University of Texas at Austin predicted that the bill would prohibit 80% of abortions in Texas and would disproportionately affect black women, lower-income women, and women who live far away from facilities that provide abortion services. Once the trigger law took effect in 2022, that estimate became a near-total ban rather than an 80% reduction.

== Academic opinions ==
The Texas Heartbeat Act is intensely controversial because it was written to frustrate judicial review and thwart the judiciary from enforcing Supreme Court precedents that, at the time, declared abortion to be a constitutionally protected right. That the Act succeeded in eliminating access to pre-viability abortions in Texas while Roe v. Wade still nominally remained the law of the land added to the controversy. Law professors who supported Roe v. Wade, such as Laurence Tribe and Michael C. Dorf, criticized the Act and its enforcement mechanism as "cynical" and "diabolical". Opponents of abortion praised the Act's circumvention of Roe v. Wade as "brilliant" and "genius".

Legal experts have noted that the act's enforcement model is not entirely new, as it bears similarities to existing private attorney general laws, including qui tam suits, in which a private citizen sues on behalf of the government and shares in any recovery. However, this enforcement model, if used the way SB 8 uses it, could be turned against other rights, including the right to bear arms, free speech, and gay marriage. Alan Dershowitz, for example, suggested in a September 2021 op-ed that liberal states could enact laws offering similar bounties for citizen lawsuits against anyone who facilitates the sale or ownership of handguns. Supreme Court justices Brett Kavanaugh and Elena Kagan raised similar concerns during arguments in United States v. Texas.

By 2025, this same worry about copycat "bounty" laws had become concrete: Texas's own Legislature used the SB 8 model again, this time against abortion pills through HB 7, and California had already used a version of it in 2022 for gun sales to minors, described further below.

Academic opinion remained divided for years on whether the Act could be subject to pre-enforcement judicial review, given that no state officials were charged with enforcing the law and were, in fact, prohibited from enforcing it. In an op-ed published in The New York Times, law professors Laurence Tribe and Steve Vladeck acknowledged that the Act's enforcement mechanism "makes it very difficult, procedurally, to challenge the bill's constitutionality in court", but argued that abortion providers "should" still be able to challenge the law's constitutionality by suing state-court judges and court clerks. The Supreme Court rejected this idea in Whole Woman's Health v. Jackson, holding that abortion providers could not sue state-court judges or court clerks under the doctrine of sovereign immunity. Other legal scholars, such as Harvard's Stephen Sachs, Yale's Akhil Reed Amar, and Edward Whelan of the Ethics and Public Policy Center, argued that SB8's unique design precludes abortion providers from challenging the constitutionality of the statute in pre-enforcement litigation. The one door those scholars generally agreed remained open was a defense-side or state-court challenge to the law's constitutionality once someone was actually sued under it — which is exactly the path the Van Stean litigation described below has since taken.

Tribe had suggested ways for the United States Department of Justice (DOJ) to combat the effects of the Texas Heartbeat Act. In a September 5, 2021 op-ed published by The Washington Post, Tribe urged DOJ to prosecute any individual who sues an abortion provider under sections 241 or 242 of the federal criminal code, which make it a crime to deprive individuals of any constitutional rights. Tribe and Rosenberg also suggested using a "civil parallel of the Ku Klux Klan Act" of 1871 to deter individuals from suing abortion providers, and recommended that the U.S. Attorney General sue private parties under the Act on the grounds of deprivation of rights under color of law. The two also cited the precedent of Larkin v. Grendel's Den, Inc., as an argument against the constitutionality of delegating certain government decisions to private parties. After Dobbs overturned Roe, the DOJ did not act on these suggestions specifically with respect to SB 8, since the underlying constitutional right the suggestions were designed to protect no longer existed.

The private remedies authorized by SB 8 can only be awarded by a state court in a lawsuit brought under SB 8, which is why Whole Woman's Health and a group of abortion providers sued a Texas judge under Section 1983 of the Civil Rights Act to enjoin him and a defendant class of all other Texas trial-level judges from entertaining SB 8 lawsuits. On September 10, 2021, a motions panel of the Fifth Circuit Court of Appeals rejected the idea that state judges and their court clerks could be sued in federal court to prevent them from hearing SB 8 cases, characterizing the approach as absurd.

An analysis by Johns Hopkins along with a study by JAMA Pediatrics published in 2024 found that Texas's overlapping abortion bans, taken together, are associated with an increase in infant mortality and newborn deaths. A related 2025 study of surgical sterilizations in Texas found that the number of women choosing permanent sterilization surgery nearly doubled in the 15 months after the Act passed, compared with the 15 months before, among a matched group of similarly aged women.

== Legal challenges ==
=== Pre-enforcement litigation by providers and advocates ===
A Dallas attorney filed a lawsuit and accompanying request for a restraining order in Dallas Texas District Court attempting to block the bill, arguing that the language of the law prevents attorneys from consulting with clients about abortion, even in cases of rape and incest, and is thus a violation of attorney-client privilege and victims' rights. This action was nonsuited and refiled in Travis County (Austin, Texas), where a version of it lives on today as part of the consolidated Van Stean litigation described below.

On September 3, 2021, a Travis County judge granted three Texas Planned Parenthood affiliates a temporary restraining order against Texas Right to Life, with a temporary injunction hearing set for September 13. The ruling temporarily blocked the anti-abortion group and affiliated individuals from suing them under the Act. Another trial court judge later signed an agreed temporary injunction order in the same case.

=== Whole Woman's Health v. Jackson ===
Before the new law went into effect, a group of abortion providers led by Whole Woman's Health (WWH) sued to get a preliminary injunction to stay enforcement of the law on September 1, 2021. Their suit included a state district court judge and his court clerk as representative defendants for all state judges and clerks that have jurisdiction to hear suits brought under the Heartbeat Act, in addition to other state officials including attorney general Ken Paxton, and a private individual who had publicly stated their intent to file suit against an abortion provider once SB 8 came into effect. The abortion clinics challenged the sovereign immunity portion of the law, arguing that because the judges and clerks are involved with enforcement of SB 8, they can be defendants to legal challenges under the Ex parte Young doctrine. In late August 2021, district judge Robert L. Pitman rejected a motion to dismiss the case and scheduled a hearing on the temporary injunction requested by the plaintiffs. An expedited appeal to the U.S. Court of Appeals for the Fifth Circuit led that court to stay the district court's proceedings, on the basis that the state official defendants were likely immune from being sued while the case against the private individual remained under consideration. The plaintiffs filed an emergency application with the Supreme Court on August 30, 2021, seeking an order to block the Act from going into effect. Late on September 1, 2021, nearly 24 hours after the Act had come into force, the Supreme Court denied the motion in an unsigned order, though four justices wrote or joined dissents that stated they would have granted the injunction pending legal evaluation.

The Fifth Circuit issued a second order on September 10, 2021, ruling that the state judges, clerks, and other officials were not proper defendants, while the case against the private individual remained pending. The plaintiffs again asked the Supreme Court to review the case on an expedited basis, and the Court agreed to hear it alongside United States v. Texas, with oral argument on November 1, 2021.

The Supreme Court issued its decision on December 10, 2021, dismissing the claims that Texas abortion providers had brought against a state-court judge, a court clerk, the state's attorney general, and a private citizen. The Court allowed the abortion providers' claims against state licensing officials to proceed beyond the motion-to-dismiss stage and sent the case back to the Fifth Circuit. On remand, the Fifth Circuit asked the Supreme Court of Texas to decide, as a matter of Texas law, whether SB 8 allowed state licensing officials to enforce it. In March 2022, the Supreme Court of Texas unanimously ruled that SB 8 does not allow state licensing officials to enforce the law, ending the abortion providers' federal pre-enforcement challenge to SB 8 for good. The Texas Attorney General's office celebrated the decision, saying it confirmed that SB 8 "can only be enforced by private parties bringing private civil enforcement actions." Three months later, Dobbs made the entire episode of trying to enjoin SB 8 before it could be enforced a moot point, since there was no longer a federal constitutional abortion right for SB 8 to conflict with.

=== United States v. Texas ===
United States Attorney General Merrick Garland announced on September 6, 2021, that the Justice Department (DOJ) would protect abortion seekers in Texas under the Freedom of Access to Clinic Entrances Act. The DOJ filed suit against the state on September 9, 2021, arguing "the law is invalid under the Supremacy Clause and the Fourteenth Amendment, is preempted by federal law, and violates the doctrine of intergovernmental immunity".

District judge Robert L. Pitman, who was also overseeing WWH v. Jackson, issued a preliminary injunction blocking enforcement of the Act on October 6, 2021, ruling that the United States government had standing to challenge Texas's law. The Fifth Circuit stayed that injunction on October 8, 2021, and kept it stayed pending appeal. The Supreme Court agreed to hear the case on an expedited basis alongside WWH v. Jackson but declined to lift the Fifth Circuit's stay in the meantime.

On December 10, 2021, the Supreme Court dismissed the writ of certiorari in United States v. Texas as improvidently granted, meaning it declined to decide the case after all and left SB 8 in place. No further federal litigation over SB 8's constitutionality has been pursued by the federal government since Dobbs eliminated the federal constitutional right the DOJ's suit had been trying to protect.

=== First lawsuits based on SB8 against an abortion provider ===
On September 18, 2021, in an op-ed published by The Washington Post, San Antonio physician Alan Braid admitted that he had performed an abortion that was illegal under the Act on September 6, saying he had "a duty of care to this patient" and that she had "a fundamental right to receive this care."

Three people sued Braid under SB 8's citizen-suit provision. On September 20, 2021, Oscar Stilley, a disbarred former Arkansas lawyer, filed suit, saying he wanted to speed up the law's day in court. Felipe Gomez, a disbarred Illinois attorney, and Wolfgang P. Hirczy de Miño also sued the same day or shortly after, both saying they hoped a court would use their suits to declare SB 8 unconstitutional. Braid, in turn, filed a federal interpleader lawsuit in Illinois against all three, asking a court to sort out which if any of their claims were valid and to declare the law unconstitutional.

These cases have since worked their way to a close. Hirczy de Miño voluntarily dropped his suit. In December 2022, a Bexar County judge dismissed Gomez's suit for lack of standing, finding that someone with no personal connection to an abortion cannot sue under the law; the Center for Reproductive Rights, representing Braid, called the ruling a "significant win" even though it came after Dobbs had already changed the broader legal landscape. A Texas appeals court later affirmed that dismissal. Braid's separate federal interpleader action was dismissed by the U.S. District Court for the Northern District of Illinois, and in July 2025 the U.S. Court of Appeals for the Seventh Circuit affirmed that dismissal, holding that the underlying questions belonged in Texas state court, not federal court. Stilley's original SB 8 lawsuit against Braid, filed in Texas state court in 2021, is the only one of the three original suits still pending, and it remains Texas's clearest test case of whether an SB 8-style claim brought by a stranger to the abortion can succeed on the merits.

=== State-court challenges to SB8 by abortion providers and funders (Van Stean v. Texas Right to Life) ===
Texas abortion providers, funders, and other plaintiffs filed a total of 14 separate lawsuits, some before the Act's September 1, 2021 effective date, against Texas Right to Life and its officers, employees, and collaborators, challenging SB 8 as unconstitutional under various provisions of the state constitution. The plaintiffs relied on the Texas Declaratory Judgments Act and sought declaratory and injunctive relief. The suits were consolidated for pretrial proceedings by the Texas Judicial Panel on Multi-District Litigation and assigned to retired judge David Peeples in Travis County.

On December 9, 2021, Judge Peeples ruled that portions of SB 8's civil-enforcement mechanism violate the Texas Constitution, but he stopped short of issuing a permanent injunction stopping the law's enforcement, leaving that question for trial. Texas Right to Life and its legislative director, John Seago, appealed the denial of their motion to dismiss the case under Texas's anti-SLAPP law (the Texas Citizens Participation Act, or TCPA), pausing the trial court proceedings while that appeal was pending. On May 26, 2023, the Court of Appeals for the Third District of Texas, in Austin, affirmed the denial of that motion, keeping the case alive. The case style for the MDL cases is Van Stean v. Texas Right to Life, No. D-1-GN-21-004179, in Travis County district court, and the appellate case is styled Texas Right to Life and John Seago v. Allison Van Stean, et al., No. 03-21-00650-CV.

Texas Right to Life then petitioned the Texas Supreme Court for review. On November 22, 2024, the Texas Supreme Court ruled that the Court of Appeals had acted too soon: because standing to sue is a threshold question of a court's basic power to hear a case at all, the appeals court should have addressed whether the plaintiffs (the abortion providers, physicians, and funds) had standing to sue before ruling on Texas Right to Life's separate anti-SLAPP argument. The Supreme Court reversed and sent the case back to the Court of Appeals to decide standing first.

On remand, the Court of Appeals for the Third District ruled on January 16, 2026 that the plaintiffs — patients, physicians, and abortion funds — do have standing to challenge SB 8's constitutionality, because Texas Right to Life had publicly announced its intent to sue them and had solicited informants for that purpose, creating a real, concrete legal dispute the courts can resolve. The court again rejected Texas Right to Life's argument that the TCPA barred the suit, reasoning that the plaintiffs were not challenging Texas Right to Life's right to speak or organize, only its ability to use what the trial court had already found to be an unconstitutional civil-enforcement mechanism against them.

That January 2026 ruling cleared away the last procedural obstacle standing between the case and a decision on the merits, so it is expected that Texas Right to Life will again ask the Texas Supreme Court to review the case — this time on the actual question of whether SB 8's no-injury, private-lawsuit enforcement system violates the Texas Constitution. As of August 2026, that final constitutional ruling has not yet been made, and it stands as the most significant unresolved legal question about SB 8 itself.

=== Marcus Silva v. Sanchez and other private lawsuits inspired by SB8 ===
SB 8's private-lawsuit approach also inspired a wrongful-death case that, while not literally filed under SB 8, borrowed its central idea: letting a private person sue over an abortion using a legal theory ordinary criminal law does not directly provide. In March 2023, Galveston County resident Marcus Silva, represented by SB 8's author Jonathan Mitchell and state Representative Briscoe Cain, sued three friends of his ex-wife, Brittni Silva, for wrongful death, claiming they helped her obtain and use abortion pills in July 2022 — a few weeks before Texas's trigger law took effect — and that this amounted to murder under Texas law. Silva sought $1 million from each woman. His ex-wife was not named as a defendant, since Texas law exempts the pregnant person herself from civil or criminal liability.

The three women countersued, alleging invasion of privacy, and the Texas Supreme Court in June 2024 let stand a lower-court ruling that Brittni Silva did not have to hand over proof that she had taken the medication. Days before the case was set to go to trial in October 2024, both sides agreed to drop all claims and counterclaims, with each side paying its own legal costs; no money changed hands. Because the case ended in a settlement rather than a ruling, it left open the broader question the lawsuit had raised: whether Texas's wrongful-death statute can be used to sue people who merely help someone else obtain an abortion.

=== Interstate conflicts and out-of-state "shield laws" ===
As abortion pills sent by mail from other states became a major way Texans continued to access abortion care after 2022, Texas officials began testing whether they could reach providers who never set foot in the state. In December 2024, Attorney General Ken Paxton sued Dr. Margaret Daley Carpenter, a New York physician and co-founder of the Abortion Coalition for Telemedicine, accusing her of unlawfully prescribing and mailing abortion pills to a woman in Collin County, Texas, without a Texas medical license. This case was brought by the state itself (under separate telemedicine and licensing statutes), not through SB 8's private-lawsuit mechanism, but it grew out of the same broader effort to make Texas's abortion restrictions reach beyond its own borders — the same goal behind SB 8 and, later, HB 7's abortion-pill provisions.

Carpenter did not appear in the Texas case, and in February 2025 a Texas judge entered a default judgment against her for more than $113,000 in penalties and fees, along with an order barring her from prescribing abortion medication to Texas residents. When Paxton's office tried to have the judgment enforced in New York, Ulster County Clerk Taylor Bruck refused, citing New York's 2023 "shield law," which bars state officials from helping enforce out-of-state judgments against protected reproductive-health providers. Paxton then sued Bruck directly, arguing New York's shield law violates the U.S. Constitution's Full Faith and Credit Clause, and New York Attorney General Letitia James intervened to defend the law. On October 31, 2025, a New York (Ulster County) judge dismissed Paxton's suit against the clerk, finding no basis to force New York to enforce the Texas judgment. This dispute remains an early, unresolved test of whether Texas can use its courts and judgments to reach abortion providers who are protected under another state's law — the same cross-border problem HB 7 was written to try to address through a private-lawsuit route rather than direct state prosecution.

=== Medical-exception litigation after Dobbs ===
Although SB 8's own "medical emergency" language was rarely the direct subject of litigation after Dobbs — because the broader trigger law's near-identical exception became the more urgent practical problem — the fight over what counts as a qualifying emergency shaped the environment SB 8 now operates in, and led directly to the Life of the Mother Act described above. In March 2023, the Center for Reproductive Rights filed Zurawski v. State of Texas on behalf of Amanda Zurawski and other women who said they were denied timely abortion care despite dangerous pregnancy complications, along with two OB-GYNs; the case eventually grew to 22 plaintiffs. A Travis County judge issued a temporary injunction in August 2023 broadening the exception, but the state's appeal automatically put that order on hold.

While Zurawski was pending, a separate, faster-moving case drew national attention: in December 2023, Kate Cox, a Dallas-area woman whose fetus had been diagnosed with full trisomy 18, asked a Travis County court to declare that she, her husband, and her doctor could not be prosecuted or sued if she had an abortion. A district judge granted the request, but Attorney General Paxton asked the Texas Supreme Court to intervene, and on December 11, 2023 the court reversed the lower court, ruling that Cox's doctor had not shown Cox met the exception's requirements. By the time the ruling came down, Cox had already left Texas to obtain an abortion elsewhere.

On May 31, 2024, the Texas Supreme Court ruled unanimously in Zurawski, declining to broaden or further define the medical-emergency exception. The court held that the existing exception, applying an objective "reasonable medical judgment" standard, was already broad enough to cover cases like Zurawski's, and it vacated the trial court's injunction. Reproductive-rights advocates argued the ruling left doctors with no more real-world clarity than before, which is the confusion the 2025 Life of the Mother Act was later written to address.

=== Other pending litigation ===
- No. 21-587, Penny Clarkston, Petitioner v. Whole Woman's Health, et al. — Docketed October 21, 2021; petition for certiorari before judgment. Ms. Clarkston was the District Clerk serving the 114th District Court and other district courts in Smith County, Texas.
- No. 21-583, Stephen Brint Carlton, et al., Petitioners v. Whole Woman's Health, et al. — Docketed October 21, 2021; petition for certiorari before judgment.
- No. 21-582, Mark Lee Dickson, Petitioner v. Whole Woman's Health, et al. — Docketed October 21, 2021; petition for certiorari before judgment. Mr. Dickson is a private individual and anti-abortion activist named as a defendant because abortion providers anticipated he would bring SB8 actions against them.
- No. 21-463, Whole Woman's Health, et al., Petitioners v. Austin Reeve Jackson, Judge, District Court of Texas, 114th District, et al. — Petition granted October 22, 2021; oral argument held November 1, 2021.
- No. 21A24, Whole Woman's Health, et al., Applicants, v. Austin Reeve Jackson, Judge, et al. — Docketed August 30, 2021; application for emergency injunction denied per curiam, with separate dissents from Chief Justice Roberts and Justices Breyer, Sotomayor, and Kagan.
- No. 21-588 / No. 21A85, United States, Petitioner v. Texas, et al. — Application to vacate the Fifth Circuit's stay of a preliminary injunction; certiorari before judgment granted for expedited argument on November 1, 2021.

Update: This list, current as of late 2021, reflected an active and rapidly moving Supreme Court docket. It has not aged well, because the underlying controversy it was tracking — whether SB 8 could be challenged in federal court before it was ever enforced — was resolved by events outside the cases themselves. The table below summarizes how each matter was actually resolved.

Resolution of the 2021 Supreme Court petitions related to SB 8
Case (docket no.)	What it asked	How it was resolved
WWH v. Jackson (No. 21-463 / 21A24)	Whether abortion providers could sue state-court judges, clerks, and officials to block SB 8 before it was enforced	Supreme Court ruled 5–4 on Dec. 10, 2021 that providers could sue state licensing officials but not judges, clerks, or the attorney general; case sent back to the Fifth Circuit and then the Texas Supreme Court, which ruled in March 2022 that licensing officials have no authority to enforce SB 8, ending the federal pre-enforcement challenge.
United States v. Texas (No. 21-588 / 21A85)	Whether the federal government itself could sue to block SB 8	Supreme Court dismissed the case on Dec. 10, 2021 as improvidently granted, meaning it declined to rule and left SB 8 in place.
Clarkston, Carlton, and Dickson petitions (Nos. 21-587, 21-583, 21-582)	Companion petitions from individual defendants named in the WWH v. Jackson litigation	Resolved together with WWH v. Jackson; became moot once that case was decided.

The broader question all of these cases were circling around — whether a state can insulate an abortion law from federal pre-enforcement review by routing enforcement through private lawsuits — was overtaken by Dobbs v. Jackson Women's Health Organization in June 2022, which removed the federal constitutional abortion right these cases were trying to protect. That is why no comparable wave of federal SB8 litigation exists after mid-2022; the live legal fight over SB 8 moved into Texas's own state courts, principally through Van Stean v. Texas Right to Life, described above.

== Aftermath ==
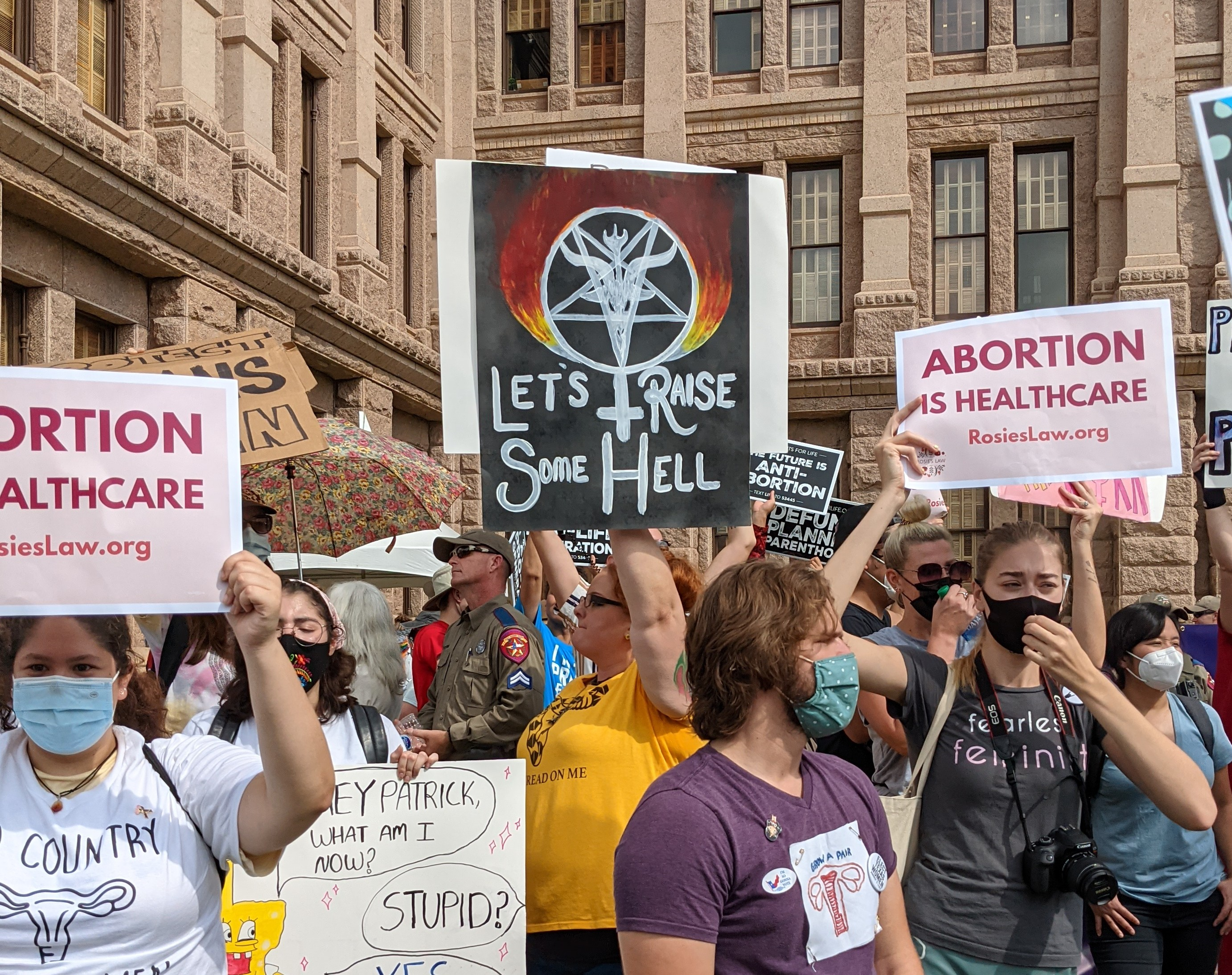
A Satanic Temple themed sign at a rally against the law at the Texas Capitol

The anti-abortion organization Texas Right to Life established a "whistleblower reporting system" that enabled residents to anonymously report suspected violators of the bill. Their website came under denial-of-service and satirical attacks featuring copypastas and eroticized fan-art of Shrek based on the prevalent internet meme, as well as large amounts of unrelated and misleading information. On September 3, 2021, webhost GoDaddy gave the website 24 hours to find a new host before terminating their service for multiple terms-of-service violations. On September 4, the website changed its domain registration to Epik; the site went offline later that day after Epik told the group they had violated its terms of service by collecting private information about third parties, and the website subsequently began redirecting users to the Texas Right to Life organization's main website.

On September 4, 2021, The Satanic Temple, a self-described nontheistic religious and human rights group, filed a letter of complaint to the US Food and Drug Administration arguing that the law violated the constitutional rights of members to free religious practice, citing the Religious Freedom Restoration Act.

In May 2024, The Washington Post reported that a Texas resident, Collin Davis, had claimed to a Texas district court that his ex-partner had obtained a legal abortion in the state of Colorado, and cited SB8 in attempting to obtain depositions from his ex-partner and people who had helped her obtain the abortion. SB8's writer, Jonathan Mitchell, acted as the lawyer for Davis.

Between 2021 and 2022, a year after the Texas Heartbeat Act went into effect, a study by the Johns Hopkins Bloomberg School of Public Health found an increase in infant deaths in Texas. In Texas alone, the occurrence of congenital anomalies increased more than 22.9% between 2021 and 2022. As described above, this data — along with ProPublica's later reporting on maternal deaths — was central to the political case Texas lawmakers made for passing the 2025 Life of the Mother Act.

== Reactions ==
Ride-sharing services Lyft and Uber announced that they would cover 100% of the legal defense costs for any of their drivers sued under this new law, while dating app companies Bumble and Match Group, owner of Tinder, announced they would establish a relief fund to assist Texas women seeking abortions.

John Gibson, the CEO of the video game developer/publisher Tripwire Interactive, tweeted in support of the bill and the Supreme Court's decision to not block its enforcement on September 4, 2021. Over the next few days, video game journalists, other developers, and members of the players' community expressed outrage at the tweet, leading to Gibson stepping down as CEO on September 6, 2021, and Tripwire distancing itself from Gibson's statement.

=== Protests ===
On the day the act went into effect, protesters rallied in the Texas state capital of Austin, Texas. Women in Dallas protested while wearing costumes from The Handmaid's Tale, a dystopian novel about women living in a totalitarian theocracy. Other small demonstrations were organized near city halls of other Texas towns. The day after the bill was enacted, the hashtag #texastaliban, a critical reference to the Taliban, trended on Twitter with over 50,000 tweets.

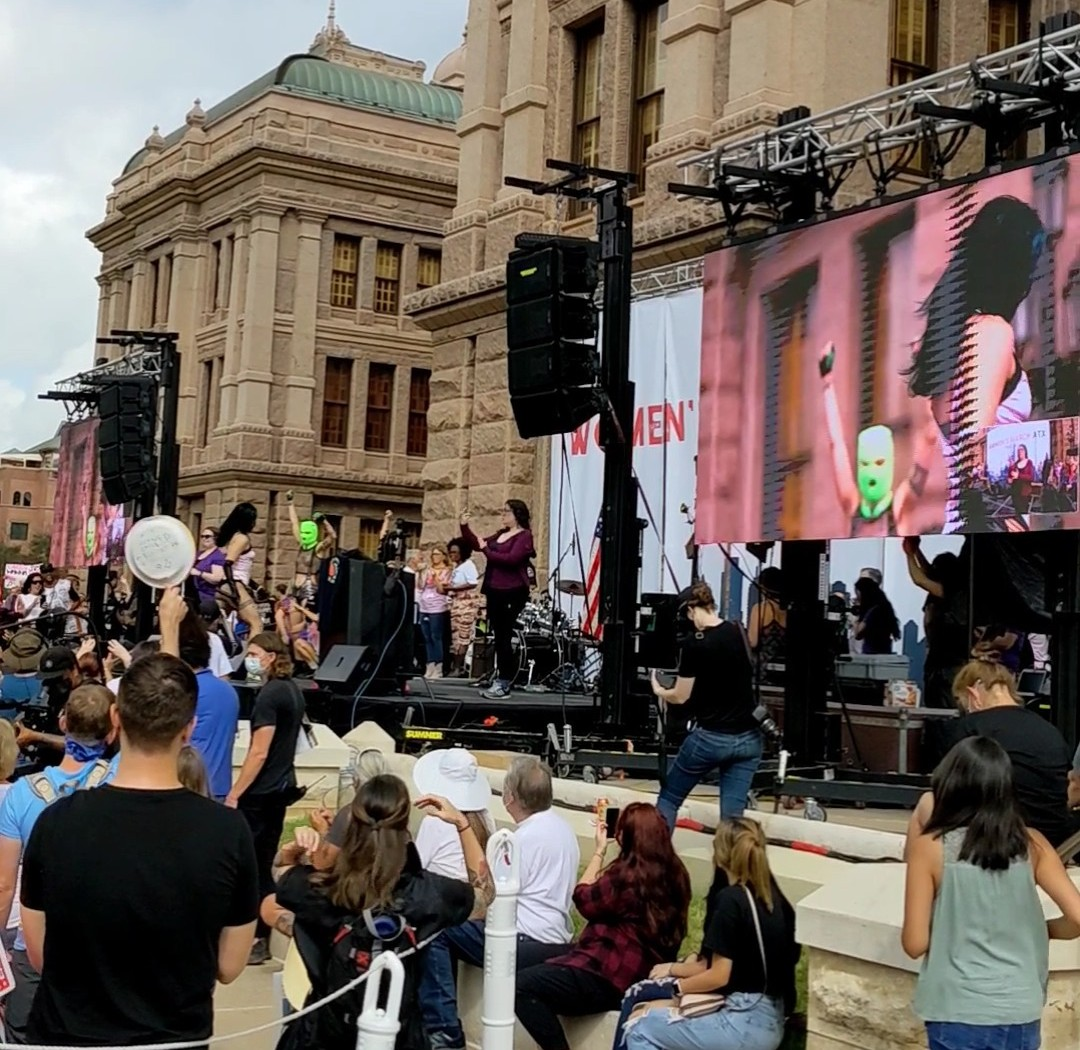
Pussy Riot performing at the 2021 Women's March at the Texas Capitol

On September 3, hacktivist group Anonymous announced "Operation Jane", an initiative to oppose the law. The group subsequently hacked the website of the Republican Party of Texas, replacing it with text about Anonymous, an invitation to join Operation Jane, and a Planned Parenthood donation link. On September 13, the group released a large quantity of private data belonging to Epik, including domain purchase and transfer details, account credentials and logins, payment history, employee emails, and unidentified private keys. The Distributed Denial of Secrets (DDoSecrets) organization said it was working to curate the leaked data for public download, describing it as "180 gigabytes of user, registration, forwarding and other information". Publications including The Daily Dot and The Record by Recorded Future subsequently confirmed the hack and the types of data exposed.

Protests occurred in about 600 places nationwide on October 2, 2021, as part of what became known as the 2021 Women's March.

Early public-opinion polling on the law itself was divided, with two 2021 polls showing a narrow plurality or majority in support. One poll found roughly 55% of Texans supported the law, compared to 45% opposed. Another poll found a plurality of 46% supporting the law, with 43% opposed. Public opinion on Texas's much stricter, near-total post-Dobbs trigger law has generally polled less favorably, and it was the pressure from that broader ban's real-world consequences — not SB 8's original six-week rule — that produced the bipartisan push behind the 2025 Life of the Mother Act.

=== Political reactions ===
President Joe Biden criticized the act, describing it as "extreme" and saying it "blatantly violates the constitutional right established under Roe v. Wade" — a right the Supreme Court eliminated less than a year later. Senator Elizabeth Warren argued that it was time to "step up and codify Roe into federal law". Congressional candidate Jessica Cisneros said the law disproportionately harmed women of color and low-income women who could not travel for care.

Some Republicans, such as South Dakota governor Kristi Noem, praised the act, while others — including 2021 Virginia gubernatorial candidate Glenn Youngkin and Senate minority leader Mitch McConnell — were more cautious about it. Other states, including Florida and Ohio, introduced legislation with language mimicking the Texas law. Florida's own six-week ban, the Heartbeat Protection Act, was signed in April 2023 and took effect in May 2024.

On December 11, 2021, a day after the Supreme Court effectively upheld enforcement of the law in Whole Woman's Health v. Jackson, Governor Gavin Newsom of California called for the state legislature to apply the legal framework from Texas's law to gun control, seeking a bill that would introduce a private right of action against manufacturers, distributors, and sellers of assault weapons or receiver blanks in the state.

At the end of April 2022, the Connecticut General Assembly passed House Bill 5414, the Reproductive Freedom Defense Act, which allows anyone sued under the Texas law, or others like it, for performing or facilitating an abortion that took place at least in part in Connecticut to countersue in that state for the equivalent amount of damages, plus attorney's fees. It also prohibits the governor of Connecticut from extraditing any Connecticut resident to another state for performing an abortion legal in Connecticut, bars courts in the state from issuing subpoenas related to such enforcement in another state, and prohibits any state or law enforcement agency in Connecticut from cooperating with such investigations. New York's own 2023 shield law, which became the subject of the Paxton–Carpenter dispute described above, works on a similar principle.

In July 2022, California Governor Gavin Newsom signed Senate Bill 1327, modeled after the Texas law, allowing private citizens to sue a licensed firearms dealer who "sells, supplies, delivers, or gives possession or control of a firearm" to anyone under 21 years old, for a minimum of $10,000 per weapon plus attorney fees. A federal judge struck down part of the law related to costs and attorney's fees in December 2022, and Governor Newsom called that ruling unconstitutional. Texas's own 2025 reuse of the SB 8 model for HB 7 confirmed that the "private bounty lawsuit" approach SB 8 pioneered has become a durable legislative tool used across the political spectrum and across policy areas well beyond abortion.

== See also ==
- Abortion in Texas
- Abortion in the United States
- City of Akron v. Akron Center for Reproductive Health
- Dobbs v. Jackson Women's Health Organization
- Faith2Action
- Six-week abortion ban
- Heart development
- Whole Woman's Health v. Hellerstedt
- Zurawski v. State of Texas
- Texas House Bill 7
- Abortion shield laws in the United States
