= Jon D. Michaels =

Law professor and author

- Born: 1975 or 1976 (age 50–51); Long Island, New York, U.S.
- Education: Williams College (BA); Worcester College, Oxford (BA, MA); Yale University (JD)
- Awards: Cudahy Award (2010, 2016)

Academic work
- Discipline: Constitutional law Administrative law National security law Public policy
- Institutions: UCLA School of Law

Jon Douglas Michaels (born 1975 or 1976) is an American legal scholar who serves as professor of law at the UCLA School of Law and advisor to the dean on civic engagement. He is a scholar of constitutional law, administrative law, national security law, and public policy. His most recent writings examine threats to democracy, political violence, presidential power, and federal-state conflict.

== Life and career ==
=== Early life and studies ===
Michaels was born and raised on Long Island, New York. His mother was a kindergarten teacher in Jericho, New York. His father was a pharmacist in Flushing, Queens. Michaels graduated summa cum laude from Williams College with a Bachelor of Arts degree in English Literature and Political Science in 1998; while at Williams, he earned a Harry S. Truman Scholarship. He then studied at Oxford University as a Marshall Scholar, earning a Bachelors in Philosophy, Politics, and Economics in 2000 and a Masters in 2006. In 2003, he graduated with a Juris Doctor from Yale Law School, where he also served as an Articles Editor for the Yale Law Journal.

=== Career ===
From 2004 to 2005, Michaels served as a law clerk to Judge Guido Calabresi of the United States Court of Appeals for the Second Circuit. He then served as a law clerk to Justice David Souter of the United States Supreme Court from 2005 to 2006. Following his clerkships, Michaels worked for the international law firm of Arnold & Porter in Washington, DC as an associate in the National Security Law and Public Policy Group.

Michaels joined the UCLA School of Law as an assistant professor in 2008. In 2013, he was awarded full tenure at UCLA. Michaels teaches courses on administrative law and national security law.

Michaels is a life member of the Council on Foreign Relations and an elected member of the American Law Institute. The American Constitution Society has twice awarded Michaels with the Cudahy Award for scholarly excellence in regulatory and administrative law — first in 2010 for his article "Privatization's Pretensions," on policymakers' use of privatization to substantively alter policies, and again in 2016 for his article "An Enduring, Evolving Separation of Powers." The Columbia Law Review published responses to the latter article by Professor Cristina Rodríguez and Professor David Fontana. Responding in the Harvard Law Review to a related article by Michaels, "Running Government Like a Business . . . Then and Now," Professor Nicholas Parrillo wrote that Michaels "makes a powerful argument" that salarization, civil service protection, and citizen participation rights "have been key to the emergence of an effective, legitimate, and meaningfully democratic government in the United States."

=== Written work ===
Michaels' first book, Constitutional Coup: Privatization's Threat to the American Republic, was published by the Harvard University Press in 2017. In 2018, the Yale Journal on Regulation held a web symposium on the book, featuring commentary from noted administrative law scholars, including Christopher Walker, Emily Bremer, and Aaron Nielson, who would go on to serve as Solicitor General of Texas. In Nielson's review, he stated that while he and Michaels disagreed on "many things[,]" he believed Michaels was "quite right that pretend privatization is a problem" — referring to "situations in which the government tries to avoid being labeled as the government, even though it still wants to exercise the powers of government," such as the example of Amtrak in Department of Transportation v. Association of American Railroads. In future-Third Circuit judge Jennifer Mascott's review, she complimented Michaels' book for being "engaging, brilliantly written, and insightful" but concluded that his "administrative separation of powers" proposal was "at odds with, and fundamentally undermines, the constitutionally mandated separation of powers already in place." The symposium additionally featured reviews by academics Jeffrey Pojanowski, Miriam Seifter, Sam Halabi, and Daniel Hemel. Pojanowski also reviewed the book in the Michigan Law Review. In a review published by the Harvard Law Review, Professor Sabeel Rahman wrote that Constitutional Coup was an "important work" that defended the administrative state "as a central pillar of our modern constitutional structure that is increasingly under threat." In a Washington Monthly book review, Joshua Alvarez wrote that Michaels "provides a useful reframing of what business-like government really means."

Michaels' second book, Vigilante Nation: How State-Sponsored Terror Threatens Our Democracy, was co-authored by David Noll and published by Atria/One Signal, an imprint of Simon & Schuster, in 2024. The book concerns right-wing violence and authoritarianism in the United States, and proposes legal responses by Democratic-majority states.

His current book project, titled The Semi-United States, will be published by Oxford University Press in 2027. This book provides "a blueprint for how states can use federalism and interstate compacts to fortify American democracy against federal dysfunction and sabotage."

Michaels has provided legal analysis for the New York Times, Washington Post, Los Angeles Times, Time magazine, Foreign Affairs, CNN, and the Boston Globe.

== Publications ==
=== Books ===
- Michaels, Jon D. (2017). Constitutional Coup: Privatization's Threat to the American Republic. Harvard: Harvard University Press.
- —; Noll, David. (2024). Vigilante Nation: How State-Sponsored Terror Threatens Our Democracy. New York: Atria/One Signal Publishers.
- Michaels, Jon D. (2027) (forthcoming). The Semi-United States. Oxford: Oxford University Press

=== Selected articles ===
- Michaels, Jon D. (2010). “Privatization’s Pretensions”. University of Chicago Law Review. 77 (2): 717–780.
- —. (2010). “Deputizing Homeland Security”. Texas Law Review. 88 (7): 1435–1473.
- —. (2013). “Privatization’s Progeny”. Georgetown Law Journal. 101 : 1023–1088.
- —. (2015). “Running Government Like a Business… Then and Now”. Harvard Law Review. 128 (4): 1152–1183.
- —. (2015). “An Enduring, Evolving Separation of Powers”. Columbia Law Review. 115 (3): 515–598.
- —. (2016). “Of Constitutional Custodians and Regulatory Rivals: An Account of the Old and New Separation of Powers”. New York University Law Review. 91 (2): 227–291.
- —; Huq, Aziz Z. (2016). "The Cycles of Separation-of-Powers Jurisprudence". Yale Law Journal. 126 (2): 346–437.
- —. (September / October 2017). "Trump and the 'Deep State'". Foreign Affairs.
- —. (2020). “We the Shareholders: Government Market Participation in the Postliberal U.S. Political Economy”. Columbia Law Review. 120 (2): 465–547.
- —; Emerson, Blake. (2021). “Abandoning Presidential Administration: A Civic Governance Agenda to Promote Democratic Equality and Guard Against Creeping Authoritarianism”. UCLA Law Review. 68 (1): 104–134.
- —; Noll, David L. (2021). “Vigilante Federalism”. Cornell Law Review. 108 (5): 1187–1264.
- —. (June 2024). "A Deep State of His Own". Foreign Affairs.

== See also ==
- List of law clerks for the third seat of the Supreme Court of the United States
- Deep state conspiracy theory in the United States
