= United States v. Texas (2021) =

2021 United States Supreme Court case on abortion

- Supreme Court of the United States

Argued November 1, 2021 Decided December 10, 2021
- Full case name: United States v. Texas, et al.
- Docket no.: 21-588
- Citations: 595 U.S. 74 (more) 142 S. Ct. 522; 211 L. Ed. 2d 349; 2021 U.S. LEXIS 6143
- Argument: Oral argument
- Decision: Opinion

Case history
- Prior: United States v. State of Texas, No. 1:21-cv-796 (W.D. Tex. Sept. 9, 2021); United States v. State of Texas (5th Cir. filed Oct. 7, 2021).

Holding
- The writ of certiorari is dismissed as improvidently granted.

Court membership
- Chief Justice John Roberts Associate Justices Clarence Thomas · Stephen Breyer; Samuel Alito · Sonia Sotomayor; Elena Kagan · Neil Gorsuch; Brett Kavanaugh · Amy Coney Barrett

Case opinions
- Per curiam
- Dissent: Sotomayor (did not file or join an opinion)

United States v. Texas, 595 U.S. 74 (2021), was a United States Supreme Court case that involved the Texas Heartbeat Act, also known as Senate Bill 8 or SB8, a state law that bans abortion once a "fetal heartbeat" (Note: Medical and reproductive health experts, including the American Medical Association and the American College of Obstetricians and Gynecologists, say that references to "fetal heartbeats" are medically inaccurate and intentionally misleading because a conceptus is not called a fetus until after ten weeks of pregnancy, before which the proper term is an embryo, as well as that at six weeks the embryo has no heart, which at that stage is only a group of cells which will become a heart.) is detected, typically six weeks into pregnancy. A unique feature of the Act, and challenges to it, is the delegation of enforcement to any and all private individuals who are authorized by the Act to file civil actions against abortion providers who violate it, and aiders and abetters, while state and local officials are prohibited from doing so. Opponents stated that the Act went against the landmark 1973 Supreme Court decision Roe v. Wade, which, prior to its overturn in 2022, banned states from prohibiting abortions during the first trimester of pregnancy in favor of the woman's right to privacy guaranteed by the Fourteenth Amendment.

As one of several challenges to the law, the Supreme Court within United States v. Texas was asked to consider and decide whether the federal government has standing and the right to sue Texas for injunctive and declaratory relief to stop enforcement of the Act through private civil litigation in the Texas judicial system. The case was fast-tracked by the Court and heard on November 1, 2021, alongside Whole Woman's Health v. Jackson, which was brought by abortion providers and allies as a pre-enforcement challenge to the constitutionality of the Texas Heartbeat Act. The Supreme Court ruled in a per curiam decision in December 2021 that the writ of certiorari was improvidently granted, and dismissed the case.

== Background ==
Texas passed the Texas Heartbeat Act in May 2021, with the bill going into effect on September 1, 2021. One of several heartbeat bills in the country, Texas's bill banned abortion once "cardiac activity" in an embryo can be detected, typically after six weeks of pregnancy. Because of the potential conflict with the Supreme Court's ruling in Roe v. Wade in that states could not regulate abortions during the first trimester (three months) of pregnancy in the interest of the right of privacy for women, the Texas Heartbeat Act does not allow the state to enforce the ban, but instead gives power to any interested party to sue anyone that performs an illegal abortion or supports that, and seek statutory damages of at least $10,000 in courts.

== District Court ==
On September 6, 2021, United States Attorney General Merrick Garland announced that the Department of Justice (DOJ) would protect abortion seekers under the Freedom of Access to Clinic Entrances Act. On September 8, 2021, The Wall Street Journal reported that the Biden administration planned to sue Texas on the basis that the Act "illegally interferes with federal interests".

=== Initial filing ===
On September 9, 2021, the DOJ filed a civil action (Note: United States v. State of Texas, No. 1:21-cv-796 (W.D. Tex. Sept. 9, 2021)) against the State of Texas in the U.S. District Court for the Western District of Texas. The complaint, brought in the name of the United States of America, avers that "the law is invalid under the Supremacy Clause and the Fourteenth Amendment, is preempted by federal law, and violates the doctrine of intergovernmental immunity". The DOJ further noted that the United States government has "an obligation to ensure that no state deprive individuals of their constitutional rights". The complaint avers that Texas enacted the law "in open defiance of the Constitution". The relief sought from the federal district court included a declaration that the Act is unconstitutional, and an injunction against state actors as well as any and all private individuals who may bring an SB 8 action. The idea of asking a federal court to impose an injunction upon the entire civilian population of a state was unprecedented.

On September 15, 2021, six days after their initial filing, DOJ lawyers filed an emergency motion for a temporary restraining order or a preliminary injunction. District Judge Robert Pitman, who also sat in Whole Woman's Health v. Jackson, then issued an order setting an evidentiary hearing for October 1, 2021, noting that the State of Texas opposed an immediate ruling and wanted to be heard. A day later, Pitman also rejected the DOJ's motion for an expedited briefing schedule, observing that "this case presents complex, important questions of law that merit a full opportunity for the parties to present their positions to the Court". A number of states' attorneys general weighed in with a jointly-filed amicus curiae brief.

The temporary restraining order request thus having been bypassed, a preliminary injunction hearing took place on October 1, 2021. To prepare for it, the State of Texas, represented by lawyers from the Office of the Texas Attorney General (OAG), moved for an accelerated schedule to take the depositions of people who signed sworn declarations in support of the DOJ's application for emergency injunctive relief. The State's attorneys insisted that this was necessary because the DOJ's motion relies heavily on, and profusely cites, factual assertions made in those supporting declarations.

=== Addition of intervenor defendants ===
On September 22, three individuals, two men and one woman, jointly moved to intervene in the case, seeking to protect their right to file SB8 lawsuits involving abortions that were already illegal prior to SB8 coming into effect. They opposed the proposed injunction sought by the United States on grounds of overbreadth, and averred that the court cannot enjoin "every person in the world" from filing an SB8 suit in every type of fact scenario, pointing to the severability provisions of SB8.

Unlike the two out-of-state plaintiffs that already sued an abortion provider under SB8 in state court (one of whom has since intervened in the federal case), the three would-be intervenors in United States v. Texas said they planned to sue abortion funders in the future. They are residents of Texas, but are adamant that the Texas Attorney General cannot represent them as private citizens. All three were represented by Jonathan F. Mitchell, a Texas Right to Life attorney involved in more than a dozen state court cases before the Texas MDL Panel for possible consolidation. In addition to the "patently overbroad remedy that the United States is seeking", the intervenors also complained about not having been served. The United States only named one defendant, the State of Texas, and issued summons on the Attorney General, who had yet to file an answer on behalf of the State, although attorneys from his office filed procedural motions. The Attorney General did not oppose the intervention, which Judge Pitman subsequently granted.

The discovery hearing set for September 22, 2021, was cancelled following an objection by the United States to Texas's demand to take multiple depositions before the preliminary injunction hearing set for October 1, 2021. Discovery nevertheless proceeded on a limited scale.

On September 28, 2021, Judge Pitman granted the motions to intervene presented by the trio of Texas residents and the one submitted by out-of-state movant Oscar Stilley, cutting him some slack regarding pleading formalities in light of his pro-se status. The intervenors' participation at the preliminary injunction hearing was limited to facts and arguments different from those offered by the parties. This is based on their representation that the State of Texas and its Attorney General cannot adequately represent their interests. The order is stamped docket item 40. Pitman also denied the State's request for an in-person hearing in expectation of a large crowd of spectators, potentially from a wide geographic area.

On September 29, the State of Texas and the three private intervenors filed their respective responses in opposition to the DOJ's motion for a preliminary injunction. The latter also requested additional time at the October 1, 2021 video conference to cross-examine the Biden administration's witnesses. The Texas Attorney General's lawyers additionally moved to dismiss the entire case for lack of jurisdiction, but triggered a notice of deficiency because they included their jurisdictional counter-attack within the same document, instead of filing it separately. Jurisdictional arguments in theory take precedence (because they would preclude temporary injunctive relief), but no hearing was set or requested on an emergency basis on the State's motion to dismiss. That left the possibility that the want-of-jurisdiction argument would be deemed a defensive issue in the adjudication of the DOJ's motion for affirmative interim relief. The Attorney General's lawyers argued, inter alia, that the United States doesn't have a cause of action against Texas under the circumstances presented because Congress hasn't authorized one, and that therefore there is no case or controversy for Article III standing purposes, and that the first element under the preliminary injunction test cannot be satisfied for the same reason. There are, however, numerous other legal arguments in the briefing, which made it necessary for them to request leave to exceed the applicable page limit. Judge Pitman took all arguments and evidence under advisement at the conclusion of the hearing, and indicated that an order would be forthcoming, without stating a date.

=== Preliminary injunction order against Texas ===
Judge Pitman issued a 113-page order on October 6, 2021, blocking enforcement of the law. Pitman concluded that the United States has a sovereign right to sue Texas for equitable relief even without an express cause of action enacted by Congress authorizing the Attorney General to sue the State to vindicate abortion rights. The injunctive relief, based on the conclusion that SB8 is unconstitutional in its entirety (i.e. facially) covers all Texas state judges, court clerks, and private citizens involved in litigation in which an SB8 claim is asserted. Inter alia, Judge Pitman refused to give effect to the severance provision that are part and parcel of the statute as enacted by the Texas legislature, and found it appropriate to enjoin the entire Texas judiciary and their clerks. The Fifth Circuit had already ruled that state judges cannot be precluded from entertaining and adjudicating SB8 actions, and that these judicial officers would be bound by U.S. Supreme Court precedents when sitting in such cases. Pitman, however, accepted the DOJ's theory that state judges, clerks, and SB8 litigants are all state actors for SB8 enforcement purposes, and concluded that sovereign immunity of state actors provided no viable defense when the United States sues a disobedient state as the ultimate parens patriae.

The order was appealed to Texas in the Fifth Circuit, which was expected to stay the injunction and reverse it at least in part as overbroad. Law professor Josh Blackman did not believe there was an equitable cause of action under these circumstances. Heartbill Act author and sponsor Senator Bryan Hughes expected that the preliminary injunction would be reversed on appeal.

Following the issuance of Pitman's order, Whole Woman's Health, alongside several clinics in the state, resumed conducting abortions the next day, according to The Texas Tribune. Other abortion providers were more guarded.

== Fifth Circuit ==
On October 8, 2021, the State of Texas, through its Solicitor General, Judd Stone, filed an emergency motion for a stay of Judge Pitman's injunction in the Fifth Circuit Court of Appeals. (Note: United States Court of Appeals for the Fifth Circuit; Docket #: 21-50949) Later that same day, an appeals court panel composed of judges Catharina Haynes, James C. Ho, and Carl E. Stewart released a per curiam order placing a temporary administrative hold on the injunction from the district court "pending the court's consideration of the emergency motion". (Note: "COURT ORDER that Appellant's emergency motion to stay the preliminary Injunction pending appeal is temporarily held in abeyance pending further order by this motions panel. Appellee is directed to respond to the emergency motion by 5 pm on Tuesday, October 12, 2021. IT IS ORDERED that Appellant's alternative motion for a temporary administrative stay pending the court's consideration of the emergency motion is GRANTED [9685420-4]. [21-50949] (MCS) [Entered: 10/08/2021 08:20 PM]") A reply to DOJ's response to the State's emergency stay motion was requested by October 14, 2021, which implied that a decision would not be issued before that filing was tendered and considered. Amicus curiae briefs were also submitted.

Late on October 14, 2021, the motions panel upheld the State's and the three aligned Intervenors' motions for an emergency stay in a brief order that upheld the law by the Supreme Court and the Fifth Circuit in the pending WWH v. Jackson case. They also ordered that the appeal on the merits be jointly taken up on an accelerated basis by the same panel of the Fifth Circuit that was to hear oral argument in the WWH v. Jackson appeal.

== Supreme Court ==
The DOJ then announced its plan to file an application for emergency relief in the Supreme Court, which it did on October 18, 2021. Accelerated responses were due on October 21, 2021, in this case, as well as in another emergency filing by the plaintiffs in WWH v. Jackson, in which abortion providers seek a pre-judgment writ of certiorari concerning SB8. It appeared that both cases would be considered jointly.

On October 22, 2021, the Supreme Court declined to grant the DOJ's emergency request to lift the Fifth Circuit's stay of Judge Pitman's preliminary injunction against Texas, but granted the petition for certiorari before judgment and set oral arguments for November 1, 2021, along with an accelerated briefing schedule. Justice Sonia Sotomayor concurred in the decision to hear the case on an expedited basis, but dissented on the denial of an immediate stay in the interim.

During oral arguments related to United States v. Texas, the Court questioned the government's argument that its authority applied to this case.

In a per curiam decision on December 10, 2021, alongside their decision in WWH, the Supreme Court dismissed the case as improvidently granted.
