= Jerry Edwin Smith =

American attorney and jurist (born 1946)

Jerry Smith
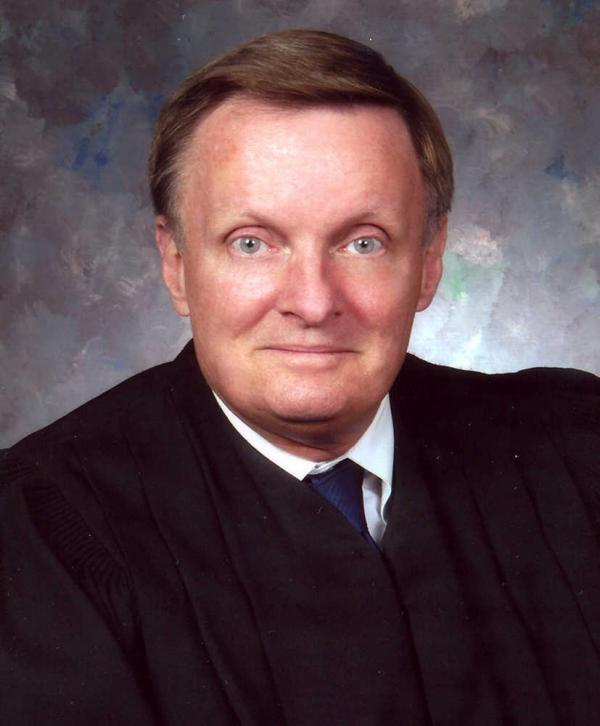

Judge of the United States Court of Appeals for the Fifth Circuit
- Incumbent
- Assumed office December 21, 1987
- Appointed by: Ronald Reagan
- Preceded by: Seat established

Personal details
- Born: Jerry Edwin Smith; November 7, 1946 (age 79) Del Rio, Texas, U.S.
- Education: Yale University (BA, JD)

Jerry Edwin Smith (born November 7, 1946) is an American lawyer and jurist serving as a United States circuit judge of the United States Court of Appeals for the Fifth Circuit since December 1987.

== Early life and education ==
Smith was born on November 7, 1946, in Del Rio, Texas. After high school, he graduated from Yale University with a Bachelor of Arts degree in 1969 and earned a Juris Doctor from Yale Law School in 1972. At Yale, he was a member of the Calliopean Society.

== Career ==
Smith clerked for Judge Halbert O. Woodward of the United States District Court for the Northern District of Texas from 1972 to 1973. After his clerkship, he joined the law firm Fulbright & Jaworski (now Norton Rose Fulbright), where he became a partner in 1981.

Smith was Director of the Harris County Housing Authority in Texas from 1978 to 1980. He was a special assistant attorney general of Texas from 1981 to 1982. He was Chairman of the Houston Civil Service Commission from 1982 to 1984. He was the City Attorney for the City of Houston from 1984 to 1987.

== Federal judicial service ==
Smith was nominated to the United States Court of Appeals for the Fifth Circuit by President Ronald Reagan on June 2, 1987, to a new seat created by 98 Stat. 333. He was confirmed by the United States Senate on December 19, 1987, and received his judicial commission on December 21, 1987.

=== Notable cases ===
==== 1991 on EPA regulation ====
In Corrosion Proof Fittings v. EPA, Smith wrote a panel opinion that required the United States Environmental Protection Agency to use cost-benefit analysis when deciding whether to ban a toxic substance.

==== 2010 on deep water drilling ====
Smith was one of three judges on a panel that heard the appeal to Hornbeck Offshore Services LLC v. Salazar, a case challenging the U.S. Department of the Interior's six-month moratorium on exploratory drilling in deep water that was adopted in the wake of the Deepwater Horizon explosion and the subsequent oil spill. The lower court had struck down the United States Department of the Interior's moratorium as arbitrary and capricious government action, and the Fifth Circuit panel denied the government's emergency request to stay the lower court's decision pending appeal.

==== 2012 on Obamacare ====
In April 2012, during oral argument in a Fifth Circuit case involving the Patient Protection and Affordable Care Act (ACA), Smith ordered the United States Department of Justice to provide his panel of three judges with a three-page, single-spaced report explaining President Barack Obama's views on judicial review. Smith's order was prompted by Obama's recent press conference remarks on the then-pending case National Federation of Independent Business v. Sebelius before the Supreme Court in which the Court was considering, among other things, whether to strike down the entire ACA as unconstitutional. Obama had stated that if the Supreme Court overturned the ACA, it would be "an unprecedented, extraordinary step of overturning a law that was passed by a strong majority of a democratically elected Congress," and that a law that was passed by Congress on an economic issue had not been overturned by the court "going back to the '30s, pre New Deal." These remarks were criticized by many as historically and legally inaccurate. Though Judge Smith's response and order were criticized by some legal scholars and members of the press, George W. Bush administration U.S. Attorney General and former judge Michael Mukasey defended Smith, stating that Obama's remarks had called judicial review "into question", so that "the court has, it seems to me, every obligation to sit up and take notice of Mr. Obama." U.S. Attorney General Eric Holder said that the Justice Department would respond "appropriately" to Smith's request and filed a short response, conceding that the federal courts have the power to strike down laws passed by Congress but citing Supreme Court precedent for the proposition that those laws are presumed constitutional and should only be overturned "sparingly".

==== 2012 on the scope of Congress's power ====
In July 2012, Smith authored the majority opinion for the en banc Fifth Circuit in United States v. Kebodeaux, holding that, once a former federal convict has fully served his sentence and been unconditionally released from prison, the federal government cannot regulate his purely intrastate conduct merely because he was once convicted of a federal crime. Smith's majority opinion further held that the mere possibility that a person may move interstate in the future is an insufficient basis for the federal government to regulate that person under the Interstate Commerce Clause. The decision was reversed 7–2 by the Supreme Court in United States v. Kebodeaux (2013), on the grounds that Kebodeaux himself was not unconditionally released from federal custody because a law in effect at the time of his offense required him to register as a sex offender after his release from prison. However, a concurring opinion by Chief Justice Roberts agreed with Judge Smith's en banc opinion on the core issue that "[t]he fact of a prior federal conviction, by itself, does not give Congress a freestanding, independent, and perpetual interest in protecting the public from the convict's purely intrastate conduct."

==== 2019 on qualified immunity ====
In 2019, Smith wrote the majority opinion in Taylor v. Williams, a civil rights case filed by a prisoner against several correctional officers for their treatment of him, during which he subjected to six days' seclusion in cells covered in feces, with no water or toilet available. Smith granted qualified immunity to the officers because he ruled that it "wasn't clearly established" that "prisoners...housed in cells teeming with human waste [for] a time period so short violated the Constitution," holding that the illegality of such actions was not "beyond debatable."

==== 2021 on 2020 election ====
On January 2, 2021, Smith, along with Judges Patrick Higginbotham and Andrew Oldham, affirmed the dismissal for lack of jurisdiction of a lawsuit filed by Louie Gohmert against Vice President Mike Pence aimed at empowering the latter to overturn President-elect Joseph Biden's Electoral College win.

==== 2022 on vaccine mandates ====
On February 9, 2022, Smith and Judge Don Willett formed the majority of a panel that declined to rule on a request to stay a preliminary injunction against Biden's COVID-19 vaccine mandate for federal employees. Judge Stephen A. Higginson dissented from the ruling, arguing that the government was entitled to an immediate stay while it appealed.

On February 17, Smith dissented when the panel majority consisting of Judges Jennifer Walker Elrod and Andrew Oldham reversed the district court's order denying a preliminary injunction to employees challenging United Airlines' vaccine mandate. Smith's nearly 60-page dissent accused the majority of flouting "fifty years of precedent and centuries of Anglo-American remedies law" and ignoring the text of the relevant statute "to extract its desired result." He also criticized the majority for hiding its "made-up" legal theory in an unsigned and unpublished opinion. Judge Smith concluded, quoting the late Supreme Court Justice Antonin Scalia, "if I ever wrote an opinion authorizing preliminary injunctive relief for plaintiffs without a cause of action, without a likelihood of success on the merits (for two reasons), and devoid of irreparable injury, despite the text, policy, and history of the relevant statute, despite the balance of equities and the public interest, and despite decades of contrary precedent from this circuit and the Supreme Court, all while inventing and distorting facts to suit my incoherent reasoning, 'I would hide my head in a bag.'" Slate magazine described Smith's dissent as a "60-page burst of fury" and "one of the angriest dissents of his career".

==== 2023 on death penalty ====
On October 9, 2023, Smith dissented from an order upholding a stay of execution for convicted murderer Jedidiah Murphy. Smith attached a fake majority opinion to his otherwise brief dissent, demonstrating what he thought the majority opinion should have been.

==== 2025 on redistricting ====
On November 18, 2025, Smith filed a 104-page dissent from a three-judge mixed-level court ruling invalidating Texas' mid-decade redistricting of the state's congressional map written by United States District Court for the Southern District of Texas judge Jeff Brown, a Trump appointee. Smith argued that "the main winners from Judge Brown's opinion are George Soros and Gavin Newsom. The obvious losers are the People of Texas and the Rule of Law." Various sources described the dissent, which described Judge Brown as an "unskilled magician" conducting "pernicious judicial misbehavior", as "extraordinary", "unusual", a personal attack on Brown, and "berserk".

== Clerks ==
Judge Smith's former clerks include:

- Hon. Matthew Ackerman (2019–20), judge, Michigan Court of Appeals
- Dana Berliner (1991–92), litigation director at the Institute for Justice
- Hon. Jimmy Blacklock (2005–06), chief justice, Texas Supreme Court
- Ronald J. Colombo (1998–99), professor of law, Maurice A. Deane School of Law at Hofstra University
- Sean J. Cooksey (2014–15), commissioner, Federal Election Commission
- Tom Cotton (2002–03), U.S. Senator
- Hon. Joseph M. Ditkoff (1996–97), associate justice, Massachusetts Appeals Court
- Hon. Susanna Dokupil (2000–01), justice, Texas Court of Appeals
- Hon. Grant Dorfman (1992–93), judge, Texas Business Court
- Thomas Dupree (1997–98), former principal deputy assistant attorney general, Civil Division, U.S. Department of Justice
- Hon. Allison H. Eid (1991–92), judge, U.S. Court of Appeals for the Tenth Circuit, and former justice of the Colorado Supreme Court
- Scott Glabe (2012–2013), former Assistant Secretary of Homeland Security for Trade and Economic Security and Senior Official Performing the Duties of the Under Secretary of Homeland Security for Strategy, Policy, and Plans
- Stephen E. Henderson (1999–2000), Judge Haskell A. Holloman Professor of Law, University of Oklahoma College of Law
- Jim Hawkins (2006–07), Alumnae College Professor of Law, University of Houston Law Center
- Hon. James C. Ho (1999–2000), judge, U.S. Court of Appeals for the Fifth Circuit, and former solicitor general of Texas
- Thomas Johnson (2005–06), former general counsel, Federal Communications Commission
- Daryl Joseffer (1995–96), former Principal Deputy Solicitor General of the United States
- Lee Kovarsky (2004–05), Bryant Smith Chair in Law, University of Texas School of Law
- Julian Ku (1998–99), vice dean for academic affairs, Maurice A. Deane Distinguished Professor of Constitutional Law and Faculty Director of International Programs, Maurice A. Deane School of Law at Hofstra University, and cofounder of Opinio Juris
- Thom Lambert (1998–99), Wall Family Chair of Corporate Law and Governance, University of Missouri School of Law
- Mithun Mansinghani (2011–12), former Solicitor General of Oklahoma
- Hon. Richard T. Morrison (1993–94), judge, United States Tax Court
- Hon. John B. Nalbandian (1994–95), judge, U.S. Court of Appeals for the Sixth Circuit
- Keith Noreika (1997–98), former acting Comptroller of the Currency of the United States
- Aaron Nielson (2007–08), professor of law, J. Reuben Clark Law School at Brigham Young University
- Margaret Peterlin (2000–01), former Chief of Staff to the United States Secretary of State and former Deputy Under Secretary of Commerce for Intellectual Property and deputy director of the United States Patent and Trademark Office
- Prerak Shah (2010–11), former Acting U.S. Attorney for the Northern District of Texas and former chief of staff and chief counsel to U.S. Senator Ted Cruz
- Hon. Stephen S. Schwartz (2008–09), judge, United States Court of Federal Claims
- Ilya Somin (2001–02), professor of law, George Mason University School of Law, and Volokh Conspiracy contributor
- David H. Steinberg (1993–94), screenwriter
- Todd Zywicki (1993–94), George Mason University Foundation Professor of Law and executive director of the Law & Economics Center, George Mason University School of Law, and Volokh Conspiracy contributor

== See also ==
- List of United States federal judges by longevity of service

Legal offices
New seat	Judge of the United States Court of Appeals for the Fifth Circuit; 1987–present	Incumbent
