= Green Bag =

Green Bag may refer to:

- The Green Bag (1889–1914), a defunct legal magazine
- The Green Bag (1997), a law journal established in 1997
- Debbie Meyer Green Bags, a brand of food storage bags
- Green bags, or reusable shopping bags

== See also ==
- "Little Green Bag", a 1969 George Baker song
