= Whole Woman's Health =

Whole Women's Health may refer to:

- Whole Woman's Health v. Hellerstedt, US Supreme Court decision that Texas cannot place restrictions on the delivery of abortion services that create an undue burden for women seeking an abortion
- Whole Woman's Health v. Jackson, US Supreme Court decision that abortion providers could not sue state-court judges, court clerks, or the state's Attorney General in an effort to stop the filing of private civil-enforcement lawsuits, but abortion providers' claims against state licensing officials could proceed past the motion-to-dismiss stage
