= Certiorari before judgment =

US Supreme Court certiorari without a Court of Appeals decision

A petition for certiorari before judgment, in the Supreme Court of the United States, is a petition for a writ of certiorari in which the Supreme Court is asked to immediately review the decision of a United States District Court, without an appeal having been decided by a United States Court of Appeals, for the purpose of expediting the proceedings and obtaining a final decision.

Certiorari before judgment is rarely granted. Supreme Court Rule 11 states that this procedure will be followed "only upon a showing that the case is of such imperative public importance as to justify deviation from normal appellate practice and to require immediate determination in this Court."

In some situations, the court has also granted certiorari before judgment so that it could review a case at the same time as a similar case that had already reached the court otherwise.

The power to grant certiorari before judgment is provided by statute, which authorizes the Supreme Court to review "cases in the courts of appeals" by granting certiorari "before or after rendition of judgment or decree". A party to the case may petition to the Supreme Court "at any time before judgment", after a court of appeals has docketed the case. Only cases in a United States court of appeals are eligible, not any other court. Any party can file the petition, regardless of which party originally prevailed in the district court.

Well-known cases in which the Supreme Court has granted certiorari before judgment and heard the case on an expedited basis have included Ex parte Quirin (1942), U.S. v. United Mine Workers (1947), Youngstown Sheet & Tube Co. v. Sawyer (1952), U.S. v. Nixon (1974), Dames & Moore v. Regan (1981), Northern Pipeline Co. v. Marathon Pipe Line Co. (1982), U.S. v. Booker (2005), Department of Commerce v. New York (2019), and Whole Woman's Health v. Jackson (2021).

== List of petitions granted ==
The Supreme Court granted certiorari before judgment only three times between 1988 and 2004, and zero times from then until February 2019. Since 2019, the court has granted certiorari before judgment in more cases.

Certiorari before judgment granted since 1988 (Note: Department of Homeland Security v. Regents of the University of California (2020) (cert. granted June 28, 2019) is not included in this list because although the petition was for certiorari before judgment, the court of appeals decided the case before the Supreme Court granted the petition, so that certiorari was after judgment. United States v. Windsor (2013) (cert. granted December 7, 2012) is omitted for the same reason.)
Case	Date granted
Clark v. Roemer	June 28, 1991
Gratz v. Bollinger	Dec 2, 2002
United States v. Fanfan	Aug 2, 2004
Department of Commerce v. New York	Feb 15, 2019
Trump v. NAACP	June 28, 2019
McAleenan v. Vidal	June 28, 2019
Ross v. California	June 28, 2019
Harvest Rock Church, Inc. v. Newsom	Dec 3, 2020
High Plains Harvest Church v. Polis	Dec 15, 2020
Robinson v. Murphy	Dec 15, 2020
United States v. Higgs	Jan 15, 2021
Gish v. Newsom	Feb 8, 2021
Whole Woman's Health v. Jackson	Oct 22, 2021
United States v. Texas	Oct 22, 2021
ZF Automotive US, Inc. v. Luxshare, Ltd.	Dec 10, 2021
Students for Fair Admissions, Inc. v. University of North Carolina	Jan 24, 2022
Merrill v. Caster	Feb 7, 2022
Ardoin v. Robinson	June 28, 2022
Brnovich v. Isaacson	June 30, 2022
United States v. Texas	July 21, 2022
Biden v. Nebraska	Dec 1, 2022
Department of Education v. Brown	Dec 12, 2022
Moyle v. United States; Idaho v. United States	Jan 5, 2024
Learning Resources, Inc. v. Trump	Sep 9, 2025
Trump v. Slaughter	Sep 22, 2025
Trump v. Barbara	Dec 5, 2025
Mullin v. Doe; Trump v. Miot	Mar 16, 2026

== See also ==
- Leapfrog appeal, the equivalent in England & Wales and in Ireland
- Procedures of the Supreme Court of the United States
- Shadow docket
- King's Bench jurisdiction, a similar jurisdictional procedure in some state supreme courts
