= University of Pennsylvania Journal of Constitutional Law =

- Discipline: Constitutional law
- Language: English
- Edited by: Simone Hunter - Hobson

Publication details
- History: 1998-present
- Publisher: University of Pennsylvania Law School (United States)
- Frequency: 4/year

Standard abbreviations
- Bluebook: U. Pa. J. Const. L.
- ISO 4: Univ. Pa. J. Const. Law

Indexing
- ISSN: 1521-2823

Links
- Journal homepage

The University of Pennsylvania Journal of Constitutional Law is a scholarly journal covering the interdisciplinary study and analysis of constitutional law. The Journal is published in print and electronically by an organization of second- and third-year J.D. students at the University of Pennsylvania Law School. It is one of the top three constitutional law journals and top fifty law journals in the United States based on citations and impact. Additionally, it is the third most cited non-Law Review journal in the United States.

Articles published in the Journal have been cited by the U.S. Supreme Court, including Justice Anthony Kennedy in his dissent in Carpenter v. United States; Justice Clarence Thomas in his concurrence in Town of Greece v. Galloway; Justice Ruth Bader Ginsburg in her opinion in National Federation of Independent Business v. Sebelius; and Chief Justice John Roberts in his dissent in Arizona State Legislature v. Arizona Independent Redistricting Commission.

The Journal publishes four issues per volume, including an issue or issues devoted to its multi-day symposium. The journal is published in Philadelphia (home of the Liberty Bell, which is depicted on the journal's cover). Beginning with Volume 15, the University of Pennsylvania Journal of Constitutional Law Online (JCL Online) became the official online companion edition to the Journal. JCL Online is committed to publishing short, timely articles, usually responding to new legal developments or novel issues. The current editor-in-chief is Abigail Howell.

== Symposia ==
Each year the Journal of Constitutional Law hosts a symposium focusing on popular topics in constitutional scholarship and featuring notable constitutional law scholars. Past topics include "The Judiciary and the Popular Will" (January 29–30, 2010), and "Presidential Power in Historical Perspective: Reflections on Calabresi and Yoo's The Unitary Executive" (February 6–7, 2009). The most recent symposium, hosted in conjunction with the National Constitution Center, focused on "The Declaration at 250" (February 27, 2026).

Additionally, the Journal recently presented a joint symposium with the University of Pennsylvania Law Review titled "Civil Procedure, Judicial Administration, and the Future of the Field: A Festschrift in Honor of Professor Stephen B. Burbank" (February 12–13, 2021). This symposium brought together leading scholars in civil procedure and judicial administration, along with renowned jurists, and highlighted new scholarship in international and comparative procedure and interdisciplinary approaches.

== Notable articles ==
- Levinson, Sanford (2000). "Diversity" (PDF). University of Pennsylvania Journal of Constitutional Law. 2 (3): 573–608. Archived from the original (PDF) on July 30, 2010.
- David C. Baldus et al., The Use of Preemptory Challenges in Capital Murder Trials: A Legal and Empirical Analysis, 3 U. Pa. J. Const. L. 3 (2001)
- Sandra Day O'Connor, The Supreme Court and the Family, 3 U. Pa. J. Const. L. 573 (2001)
- Randy E. Barnett, The Original Meaning of the Necessary and Proper Clause, 6 U. Pa. J. Const. L. 183 (2003)
- Adam Raviv, Unsafe Harbors: One Person, One Vote and Partisan Redistricting, 7 U. Pa. J. Const. L. 1001 (2005)
- Vincent Phillip Muñoz, The Original Meaning of the Establishment Clause and the Impossibility of Its Incorporation, 8 U. Pa. J. Const. L. 585 (2006) (cited by Justice Clarence Thomas in his concurrence in Town of Greece v. Galloway)
- Louis H. Pollak, "Liberty": Enumerated Rights? Unenumerated Rights? Penumbral Rights? Other?, 8 U. Pa. J. Const. L. 905 (2006)
- Brian R. Decker, "The War of Information": The Foreign Intelligence Surveillance Act, Hamdan v. Rumsfeld, and the President's Warrantless-Wiretapping Program, 9 U. Pa. J. Const. L. 291 (2006)
- Laurence H. Tribe, Reflections on Unenumerated Rights, 9 U. Pa. J. Const. L. 483 (2007)
- Benjamin P. O'Glasser, "Constitutional, Political, and Philosophical Struggle: Measure 37 and the Oregon Urban Growth Boundary Controversy", V9 U. Pa. J. Const. L. 595 (2007)
- Jeremy A. Blumenthal, Meera Adya & Jacqueline Mogle, The Multiple Dimensions of Privacy: Testing Lay "Expectations of Privacy," 11 U. Pa. J. Const. L. 331 (2009) (cited by Justice Anthony Kennedy in his dissent in Carpenter v. United States)
- Paul F. Figley, The Judgment Fund: America's Deepest Pocket and Its Susceptibility to Executive Branch Misuse, 18 U. Pa. J. Const. L. 145 (2015) (cited by the DC Circuit Court of Appeals in Keepseagle v. Perdue, 856 F.3d 1039 (2017) (Edwards, J.)
- Stephen E. Henderson, Fourth Amendment Time Machines (and What They Might Say About Police Body Cameras), 18 U. Pa. J. Const. L. 933 (2016) (cited by the Second Circuit Court of Appeals in United States v. Ganias, 824 F.3d 199, 220 n. 42 (2016) (Livingtson, Lynch JJ))
- Louis S. Rulli, Seizing Family Homes from the Innocent: Can the Eighth Amendment Protect Minorities and the Poor from Excessive Punishment in Civil Forfeiture?, 19 U. Pa. J. Const. L. 1111 (2017) (cited heavily in the briefing in Timbs v. Indiana)

== Editors-in-Chief ==
- Vol. 1 - Mike N. Gold (as Coordinating Editor)
- Vol. 2 - David Liebowitz
- Vol. 3 - Jeremy A. Blumenthal
- Vol. 4 - Andrew C. von S. Smith
- Vol. 5 - Jason A. Abel
- Vol. 6 - Carlos S. Montoya
- Vol. 7 - Akua E. Asare
- Vol. 8 - Maura E. McKenna
- Vol. 9 - Ellen C. Hu
- Vol. 10 - Nabeel A. Yousef
- Vol. 11 - Jeremy T. Adler
- Vol. 12 - Jonathan P. Adams
- Vol. 13 - Emily S. Stopa
- Vol. 14 - Vivian Lee
- Vol. 15 - Megan E. Barriger
- Vol. 16 - Brandon Harper
- Vol. 17 - Zachary C. Ewing
- Vol. 18 - Barron M. Flood
- Vol. 19 - Joseph F. Camp
- Vol. 20 - Katherine J. King
- Vol. 21 - Charles S. Nary
- Vol. 22 - Myles S. Lynch
- Vol. 23 - Diana Cummiskey
- Vol. 24 - Katherine McKeen
- Vol. 25 - Simone Hunter-Hobson
- Vol. 26 - Keith G. Matier
- Vol. 27 - Saba Mengesha
- Vol. 28 - Abigail Howell
- Vol. 29 - Olivia Sinrich
