= Wolf v. Vidal =

2020 US federal court case

Batalla Vidal v. Nielsen
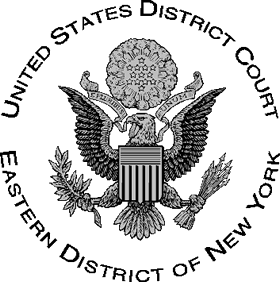
- Full case name: Martín Jonathan Batalla Vidal et al., Plaintiffs, v. Kirstjen M. Nielsen, Secretary, Department of Homeland Security, et al., Defendants. State of New York et al., Plaintiffs, v. Donald Trump, President of the United States, et al., Defendants.
- Decided: February 13, 2018
- Counsel for plaintiff: National Immigration Law Center, Make the Road New York, Jerome N. Frank Legal Services Organization (LSO) of Yale Law School
- Citation: 291 F.Supp.3d 260 (E.D.N.Y. 2018).

Case history
- Subsequent actions: Certiorari before judgment granted, McAleenan v. Vidal, 588 U.S. ___ (2019), consolidated under Department of Homeland Security v. Regents of the University of California

Holding
- Motion for Preliminary Injunction Granted

Court membership
- Judge sitting: Nicholas G. Garaufis

Wolf v. Vidal (known at lower courts as Batalla Vidal v. Nielsen), 591 U.S. ___ (2020), was a case that was filed to challenge the Trump Administration's rescission of Deferred Action for Childhood Arrivals (DACA). Plaintiffs in the case are DACA recipients who argue that the rescission decision is unlawful under the Administrative Procedure Act and the Fifth Amendment. On February 13, 2018, Judge Garaufis in the Eastern District of New York addressed the question of whether the government offered a legally adequate reason for ending the DACA program. The court found that Defendants did not provide a legally adequate reason for ending the DACA program and that the decision to end DACA was arbitrary and capricious. Defendants have appealed the decision to the Second Circuit Court of Appeals.

== Background ==
=== Deferred Action for Childhood Arrivals ===
On June 15, 2012, the Department of Homeland Security established the Deferred Action for Childhood Arrivals (DACA) program. DACA provides young immigrants who meet specific criteria with protection from deportation and eligibility for work authorization for two years. Since 2012, about 800,000 people have been granted DACA. On September 5, 2017, President Trump ordered an end to the DACA program and established a phasing out plan for DACA. The termination of the DACA program resulted in various lawsuits challenging the termination.

=== Case background ===
Prior to the Trump administration's rescission of DACA, the legality of a similar program, Deferred Action for Parents of Americans (DAPA) and a work-permit extension of DACA made alongside it, had been challenged by a coalition of 26 states led by Texas in the case United States v. Texas, 579 U.S. ___ (2016). The United States Court of Appeals for the Fifth Circuit had upheld the United States District Court for the Southern District of Texas's 2015 injunction preventing the government from enforcing the DAPA and extension of the DACA program. The federal government had challenged this to the Supreme Court, but due to the recent death of Justice Antonin Scalia, the Court was deadlocked, and left the injunction in place based on the Fifth Circuit's ruling.

Martín Batalla Vidal was the son of undocumented immigrants who had lived in New York City who only learned of his "dreamer" status in 2008. After the original DACA program was offered, Vidal applied in 2014 and had been approved in early 2015 for a three-year work permit. With the Texas District Court's injunction on DAPA and the DACA expansion, Vidal was told by the government that his approval had to be reduced to a two-year work permit, despite the injunction only affirmed to cover the Fifth Circuit states (Texas, Louisiana, and Mississippi). The injunction also affected the ability for his parents to receive deferred action for work permits under DAPA. Vidal gained the help from Make the Road New York, the National Immigration Law Center, and the Worker and Immigrant Rights Advocacy Clinic at the Yale Law School to obtain legal council and file suit against the United States Department of Homeland Security, the agency overseeing the United States Citizenship and Immigration Services which handled the DACA system, around 2016 in the United States District Court for the Eastern District of New York to challenge the agency's nationwide policy based on the circuit injunction.

While Vidal's case was being prosecuted, the Trump administration announced its plan to rescind the DACA entirely in September 2017. Vidal amended his case to assert that this action violated federal law. The amended complaint stated that the government failed to provide an explanation for the reversal of DACA, in violation of the Administrative Procedure Act, and that the Trump Administration's reversal is "unconstitutionally motivated by anti-Mexican and anti-Latino animus, in violation of equal protection component of the Due Process Clause of the Fifth Amendment."

== District court ==
In September 2017 the government declined a request from Judge Nicholas Garaufis to extend an October 2017 deadline for biannual DACA renewals. Garaufis called the Trump administration's handling of DACA "cruel" and "unacceptable". Then attorney general Jeff Sessions accused the New York judge of overstepping his judicial role.

On February 13, 2018, Garaufis granted Vidal's motion for a preliminary injunction, preventing the government from rescinding the DACA. Garaufis did assert that the government had the authority to end the DACA program. However, he stated that the reasoning provided failed the Administrative Procedure Act (APA) as it was arbitrary and capricious, based on a "plainly incorrect factual premise" that the DACA program was illegal simply because the DAPA had been found illegal via United States v. Texas. Further, Garaufis asserted that there was an internal inconsistency with the Customs office's handling of the DACA, as it was continuing to adjudicate DACA renewal applications at the same time it claimed it was winding down the program.

== Supreme Court ==
Garaufis' injunction came about a month following a similar injunction preventing the government from rescinding the DACA from California in Department of Homeland Security v. Regents of the University of California (DHS). In April 2018, Judge John D. Bates of the United States District Court for the District of Columbia also issued a similar injunction against the rescinding in the case Trump v. NAACP (NAACP). As such, these injunctions were considered to have nationwide basis preventing the government from rescinding the program.

The government had begun the appeals process for each of these cases, with Vidal's case appealed to the United States Court of Appeals for the Second Circuit. However, by November 2018, the government opted to bypass the Circuit Courts and petitioned the Supreme Court on all three cases. The Supreme Court accepted the petition on June 28, 2019, consolidating Vidal and NAACP under DHS. Oral hearings were on November 12, 2019.

The Supreme Court decided the consolidated cases in Department of Homeland Security v. Regents of the University of California on June 18, 2020, and, holding that the Duke memorandum was "arbitrary and capricious in violation of the APA", vacated the preliminary injunction issued on February 13, 2018, and remanded to DHS for further proceedings. The late Ruth Bader Ginsburg voted with the 5–4 majority. Trump tweeted that the decision was "horrible & politically charged".

== Subsequent developments ==
=== White House ===
Eleven days after the Supreme Court decision the DHS acting secretary Chad Wolf issued a memorandum that altered the terms of DACA to require annual renewal and refuse new applicants. Garaufis ruled that Wolf did not have legal authority to make changes to DACA because the appointment as DHS secretary was not confirmed by the Senate.

=== Courts ===
In Regents of the Univ. of Cal. v. United States Dep't of Homeland Sec., the Ninth Circuit distinguished Batalla Vidal where the district court granted Defendants' motion to dismiss Plaintiff's substantive APA claim that alleged that Defendants arbitrary and capriciously changed DHSs's information-use policy. In Batalla Vidal, the court found that Plaintiffs' had relied on a document that contradicted "their otherwise-unsupported allegation of a change to DHS's information-use policy." The Ninth Circuit found that Regents of the Univ. of Cal. is different from Batalla Vidal because in Regents, the most recent FAQs [document] were not attached to or referenced in any of the complaints. . . "therefore. . . materials outside the complaint cannot be considered on a motion to dismiss." In Gondal v, United States Dep't of Homeland Sec., the Eastern District of New York found that plaintiffs do "not possess a liberty or property interest in a particular decision under DACA nor an employment authorization card." The court cited Batalla Vidal to explain that because the decision to grant deferred action and work authorization is discretionary, plaintiffs are not entitled to any additional interests that are contingent on that discretionary decision. In Saget v. Trump, the Eastern District of New York cited Batalla Vidal to support their finding that plaintiffs have plausible alleged that a discriminatory purpose was a motivating factor behind the decision to terminate TPS for Haiti. The court cited language in Batalla Vidal, where Judge Garaufis noted that "liability for discrimination will lie when a biased individual manipulates a non-biased decision-maker into taking discriminatory action." In 2019, the Southern District of New York held that Batalla Vidal "does not stand for the sweeping proposition that any organization with immigrant clients has standing to sue for violations of the [Immigration National Act] INA." The court found that in De Dandrade v. United States Dep't of Homeland Sec., the organizational plaintiffs do not have a cause of action under the APA or under the Constitution because organizational plaintiffs' interests are "so marginally related" to the purposes of the INA.

== Concurrent cases ==
=== New York ===
Batalla Vidal v. Nielsen, 291 F. Supp. 3d 260 (E.D.N.Y. 2018): On February 13, 2018, the District Court granted a motion for a preliminary injunction ordering USCIS to accept DACA applications from people who have had DACA previously.

NY v. Trump, et al.: Appeal in New York v. Trump has been consolidated with the appeal in Batalla Vidal v. Nielsen.

=== California ===
Regents of Univ. of California v. United States Dep't of Homeland Sec., 279 F. Supp. 3d 1011 (N.D. Cal. 2018), aff'd sub nom. Regents of the Univ. of California v. U.S. Dep't of Homeland Sec., 908 F.3d 476 (9th Cir. 2018): On November 8, 2018, the Ninth Circuit Court of Appeals upheld the Northern District Court's nationwide injunction and ordered the Department of Homeland Security to continue accepting DACA renewal applications.

See: Regents of the University of California v. United States Department of Homeland Security

=== Maryland ===
Casa De Maryland v. U.S. Dep't of Homeland Sec., 284 F. Supp. 3d 758 (D. Md. 2018): The U.S. District Court for the District of Maryland decided not to enjoin the termination of DACA. However, the court entered an injunction prohibiting the federal government from sharing DACA applications information with immigrant enforcement. The decision has been appealed and the Fourth Circuit Court of Appeals is expected to issue a decision soon.

=== District of Columbia ===
Nat'l Ass'n for the Advancement of Colored People v. Trump, 298 F. Supp. 3d 209 (D.D.C. 2018), adhered to on denial of reconsideration, 315 F. Supp. 3d 457 (D.D.C. 2018): On August 17, 2018, the court partially stayed its order in ordering USCIS to accept to initial applications and advance parole. Now, USCIS only needs to accept renewal applications.

=== Texas ===
State of Texas, et al., Plaintiffs, v. Kirstjen M. Nielsen, et al., Defendants., (S.D.Tex. 2018): The court denied plaintiff states' motion for a preliminary injunction because of the harm it would cause to DACA recipients.
