= Judd Stone =

American lawyer

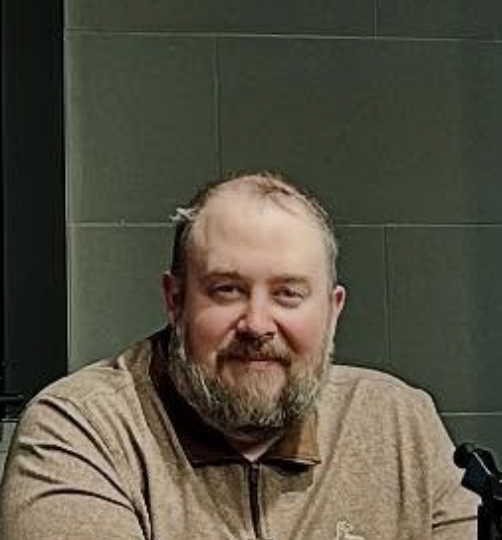

8th Solicitor General of Texas
- In office February 1, 2021 – October 2023
- Governor: Greg Abbott
- Preceded by: Kyle D. Hawkins
- Succeeded by: Aaron Nielson

Personal details
- Born: Judd Edward Stone II
- Party: Republican
- Education: University of Texas, Dallas (BA); Northwestern University (JD)

Judd Edward Stone II is an American lawyer who served as the solicitor general of Texas from February 1, 2021 to October 2023.

== Biography ==
Stone grew up in Collin County and Bexar County, Texas. He received his undergraduate degree from the University of Texas at Dallas and his Juris Doctor degree from Northwestern University Pritzker School of Law. He served as a clerk to Justice Antonin Scalia on the United States Supreme Court, to Edith Jones on the United States Court of Appeals for the Fifth Circuit, and to Justice Daniel Winfree on the Alaska Supreme Court.

He later practiced in the Supreme Court and Appellate Practice Group at Morgan, Lewis & Bockius, as well as at Kellogg, Hansen, Todd, Figel & Frederick. He subsequently served as chief counsel to U.S. Senator Ted Cruz.

=== Texas solicitor general ===
Stone joined the Office of the Texas Attorney General in 2020. In January 2021, Attorney General Ken Paxton appointed him to succeed Kyle D. Hawkins as Solicitor General of Texas. Stone assumed the position on February 1, 2021. As solicitor general, Stone served as Texas's chief appellate lawyer. During the U.S. Supreme Court's 2021–22 term, Stone argued five cases before the Court. Stone and U.S. Solicitor General Elizabeth Prelogar each argued five cases, the most of any advocates during that term; the five were Stone's first Supreme Court arguments.

==== Supreme Court litigation ====
Stone made his Supreme Court debut in November 2021, representing Texas in litigation concerning the Texas Heartbeat Act (Senate Bill 8). In Whole Woman's Health v. Jackson, Stone defended the statute's private-enforcement structure.

Stone also represented Texas in Ramirez v. Collier, concerning a death-row prisoner's request that his pastor be permitted to pray aloud and touch him during his execution.

In Torres v. Texas Department of Public Safety, Stone represented the Texas Department of Public Safety in litigation concerning state sovereign immunity and Congress's constitutional war powers. Stone represented Texas in Biden v. Texas, concerning the federal government's effort to terminate the Remain in Mexico immigration policy.

During the following Supreme Court term, Stone represented Texas officials in Reed v. Goertz, a case concerning when the statute of limitations begins to run for a federal civil-rights challenge to Texas's procedures for obtaining post-conviction DNA testing.

Stone also represented Texas in Haaland v. Brackeen, litigation concerning constitutional challenges to provisions of the Indian Child Welfare Act.

In United States v. Texas, Stone represented Texas and Louisiana in their challenge to federal immigration-enforcement priorities.

=== Paxton impeachment and departure ===
In 2023, Stone took unpaid leave from the attorney general's office to participate in Attorney General Ken Paxton's defense during his impeachment proceedings before the Texas Senate. Following Paxton's acquittal, Stone returned briefly to the attorney general's office before resigning later that year.

A 2025 lawsuit by colleague Jordan Eskew accused Stone of sexual harassment and making threats toward another official, Brent Webster. Emails cited in the case indicated Stone admitted the conduct and resigned as a result.

In a countersuit, Stone alleged Webster had tampered with witnesses during Paxton’s trial and fabricated an email referenced in Eskew’s claim.
