= Greg Coleman (jurist) =

American lawyer (1963–2010)

1st Solicitor General of Texas
- In office 1999–2001
- Attorney General: John Cornyn
- Preceded by: Position established
- Succeeded by: Julie Parsley

Personal details
- Born: Gregory Scott Coleman; October 31, 1963 San Francisco, California, U.S.
- Died: November 23, 2010 (aged 47) near Destin, Florida, U.S.
- Spouse: Stephanie Miller (m. 1987)
- Children: 3
- Education: Texas A&M University (BS, MBA); University of Texas School of Law (JD)

Gregory Scott Coleman (October 31, 1963 in San Francisco, California – November 23, 2010 near Destin, Florida) was an American lawyer and the first Solicitor General of Texas, serving in that capacity from 1999 to 2001. Prior to that, he served as a clerk for the U.S. Court of Appeals for the Fifth Circuit chief judge Edith Jones from 1992–1993; and U.S. Supreme Court Justice Clarence Thomas (1995–1996), arguing nine cases before the nation's high court in the 1990s. At the time of his appointment as solicitor general, he was working as an adjunct professor at Houston's South Texas College of Law (1993–1995) and taught Civil Procedure and Constitutional Law. He was also an adjunct professor at the University of Texas School of Law (2001–2002) where he taught United States Supreme Court Advocacy.

He was a lawyer at Weil, Gotshal & Manges LLP in its Houston office from 1993–1995, left to clerk for Justice Clarence Thomas from 1995–1996, rejoined the Weil Houston office from 1996–1998, was appointed as the first Solicitor General of Texas from 1999–2001, and rejoined Weil to head its Austin office from 2001–2007.

In 2007, he established his own law firm, Yetter Coleman.

== Personal life and death ==
Born in San Francisco to a military family, he graduated magna cum laude from Texas A&M University in 1987, with a degree in applied mathematical sciences, and received an MBA from the same institution in 1989, summa cum laude. In 1992, he graduated from University of Texas School of Law with high honors, Chancellors Academic Honor Society; while there, he was the managing editor of the Texas Law Review.

He married Stephanie Miller Coleman in 1987 and had three sons: Chase, Austin and Reid.

He died on November 23, 2010, when a Piper Malibu plane he was piloting en route to a Thanksgiving family gathering crashed on approach to an airport in Destin, Florida; two other people on board, Coleman's mother-in-law Charlene Miller (63, an assistant vice president of Texas A&M's research and graduate studies division), and her brother, James Black (58, an observer of BP's Gulf Coast restoration program), also died in the crash.

He was a member of the Church of Jesus Christ of Latter-day Saints. He was eulogized as a deeply Christian man, known for his integrity, honor and generosity both in his personal life and his professional life by the former Chief Judge of the United States Court of Appeals for the Fifth Circuit Edith Jones during a speech in the Austin Stake Center. He was also eulogized by Supreme Court Justice Clarence Thomas. He was buried in the Texas State Cemetery.

Legal offices
New office	Solicitor General of Texas; 1999–2001	Succeeded by Julie Parsely
