= Scott A. Keller =

American lawyer

Scott Keller

6th Solicitor General of Texas
- In office January 20, 2015 – September 10, 2018
- Governor: Greg Abbott
- Preceded by: Jonathan F. Mitchell
- Succeeded by: Kyle D. Hawkins

Personal details
- Born: 1981 or 1982 (age 44–45) Wisconsin, U.S.
- Party: Republican
- Spouse: Sarah Isgur (m. 2019)
- Education: Purdue University (BA); University of Texas, Austin (JD)

Scott A. Keller (born 1981/1982) is an American attorney who served as the sixth solicitor general of Texas from January 2015 to September 10, 2018.

== Early life and education ==
Keller was raised in Wisconsin. He earned a Bachelor of Arts degree in political science and philosophy from Purdue University and a Juris Doctor from the University of Texas School of Law.

== Career ==
After graduating from law school, Keller worked as a law clerk for Judge Alex Kozinski of the United States Court of Appeals for the Ninth Circuit and Associate Justice Anthony Kennedy of the Supreme Court of the United States. Keller then worked as an associate at Yetter Coleman LLP in Houston before joining the staff of Senator Ted Cruz, serving as chief counsel.

Keller was nominated to serve as solicitor general of Texas in 2015, succeeding Jonathan F. Mitchell. During his tenure, Keller argued 11 cases before the United States Supreme Court. Keller left the office in 2018 and was succeeded by Kyle D. Hawkins. Since leaving government service, Keller worked as an attorney at Baker Botts, where he specialized in Supreme Court and constitutional law. After practicing at Baker Botts, Keller co-founded of Lehotsky Keller Cohn LLP. In May 2026, he joined Chevron, the major oil and energy conglomerate, as their general counsel. Chevron Names New General Counsel — Chevron

He was a 2013 Claremont Institute Lincoln Fellow.

== Personal life ==
Keller married attorney and political commentator Sarah Isgur in a private ceremony at the Supreme Court. In July 2020, Isgur gave birth to their son, Nathanael Keller.

Keller is a member of the Federalist Society.
