= Jim Hawkins (lawyer) =

American legal scholar

James R. Hawkins is an American lawyer.

Hawkins earned a Bachelor of Arts from Baylor University and a J. D. at the University of Texas School of Law. He clerked for Jerry Edwin Smith and worked for Fulbright & Jaworski before teaching at the University of Houston Law Center as the Alumnae College Professor in Law. He later joined Daniels & Tredennick.
