= Grant Dorfman =

American judge

S. Grant Dorfman is an American judge.

Dorfman earned a Bachelor of Arts with honors in history from Brown University, followed by a Master of Studies in history and political philosophy from Oxford University, then his J.D. from Yale Law School. Dorfman clerked for Jerry Edwin Smith, and began his career with Susman Godfrey and Ogden, Gibson, White & Broocks. Between 2002 and 2008, Dorfman served on the 129th Civil District Court. He then worked for Nabors Industries. He returned to a judgeship in 2013, for the 334th District, and joined Pappas Grubbs Price in 2017. Dorfman served as deputy first assistant attorney general under Ken Paxton from December 2020, leaving the position in June 2024 to accept a gubernatorial appointment to the newly created Eleventh Business Court Division in Houston.

Dorfman is an elected member of the American Law Institute.
