= Department of Homeland Security v. Regents of the University of California =

- Supreme Court of the United States

Argued November 12, 2019 Decided June 18, 2020
- Full case name: United States Department of Homeland Security, et al. v. Regents of the University of California, et al.
- Docket no.: 18-587
- Citations: 591 U.S. 1 (more) 140 S. Ct. 1891; 207 L. Ed. 2d 353
- Argument: Oral argument

Case history
- Prior: Motion to compel completion of the administrative record granted, Regents of the Univ. of California v. Dep't of Homeland Security, No. 3:17-cv-05211, 2017 WL 4642324 (N.D. Cal. Oct. 17, 2017); Petition for writ of mandamus denied, In re United States, 875 F.3d 1200 (9th Cir. 2017); Stay denied, In re United States, 875 F.3d 1177 (9th Cir. 2017); Cert. granted, judgment vacated, In re United States, No. 17-801, 583 U.S. ___, 138 S. Ct. 443 (2017); Remanded, In re United States, 877 F.3d 1080 (9th Cir. 2017); Preliminary injunction granted, Regents of the Univ. of California v. Dep't of Homeland Security, 279 F. Supp. 3d 1011 (N.D. Cal. 2018); Affirmed, Regents of the Univ. of California v. Dep't of Homeland Security, 908 F.3d 476 (9th Cir. 2018); Cert. granted, 139 S. Ct. 2779 (2019)

Holding
- The decision on the part of the Department of Homeland Security to rescind the Deferred Action for Childhood Arrivals (DACA) was "arbitrary and capricious" in violation of the Administrative Procedure Act.

Court membership
- Chief Justice John Roberts Associate Justices Clarence Thomas · Ruth Bader Ginsburg; Stephen Breyer · Samuel Alito; Sonia Sotomayor · Elena Kagan; Neil Gorsuch · Brett Kavanaugh

Case opinions
- Majority: Roberts (except Part IV), joined by Ginsburg, Breyer, Sotomayor, Kagan
- Plurality: Roberts (Part IV), joined by Ginsburg, Breyer, Kagan
- Concur/dissent: Sotomayor
- Concur/dissent: Thomas, joined by Alito, Gorsuch
- Concur/dissent: Alito
- Concur/dissent: Kavanaugh

Laws applied
- Administrative Procedure Act; U.S. Const. amend. V

Department of Homeland Security v. Regents of the University of California, 591 U.S. 1 (2020), is a 5–4 United States Supreme Court decision that a 2017 Department of Homeland Security (DHS) order to rescind the Deferred Action for Childhood Arrivals (DACA) immigration program was "arbitrary and capricious" under the Administrative Procedure Act (APA) and reversed the order.

DACA was established in 2012 under President Barack Obama to allow children brought into the United States without proper immigration authorization to defer deportation and maintain good behavior to receive a work permit to remain in the U.S.; such children were also called "Dreamers" based on the failed DREAM Act. On his election, President Donald Trump vowed to end the DACA, and the DHS rescinded the program in June 2017. Numerous lawsuits were filed, including one by the University of California system, which many "Dreamers" attended, asserting that the rescission violated rights under the APA and the right to procedural due process under the Fifth Amendment. The University sought and received an injunction from District Court Judge William Alsup to require DHS to maintain the DACA until the case was decided. DHS challenged this order to the United States Court of Appeals for the Ninth Circuit, which upheld Judge Alsup's ruling in November 2018, and ordered the DHS to maintain the DACA throughout the U.S.

DHS petitioned to the Supreme Court, which accepted the case in June 2019, joining it with two other DACA-related lawsuits, Trump v. NAACP (Docket 18-588), which had been filed by the NAACP who challenged that rescinding the DACA had a disproportionate impact on minorities, and Wolf v. Vidal (Docket 18-589), which had been filed by a DACA recipient. Oral arguments were heard in November 2019, and the 5–4 decision given on June 18, 2020. While all nine Justices concurred in part on the judgement, the five in majority, with Chief Justice John Roberts writing for the majority, focused only on the application of the due process of the APA in the DHS's decision to rescind the DACA and found it unlawful. Justice Clarence Thomas, in his dissent in part and joined by others, argued that the Court should have further evaluated the legality of the original DACA program as part of their review.

== Background ==
Deferred Action for Childhood Arrivals (DACA) was first announced by President Barack Obama in 2012. The DACA program allowed certain individuals who entered the United States as minors to receive deferred action from deportation. Since the implementation of DACA, about 690,000 individuals have received deferred action under the program.

During his campaign for president, Donald Trump indicated that he intended to rescind DACA if he was elected. On September 5, Attorney General Jeff Sessions announced that DACA would be phased out, with DACA recipients whose DACA status expiring on or before March 5, 2018, allowed to apply to renew their DACA status by October 5, 2017. Later, President Trump indicated support for a law to protect DACA recipients.

== Lawsuit ==
On September 8, 2017, three days after the announcement of DACA's termination, the University of California and its president, Janet Napolitano, announced that they had filed a lawsuit in the United States District Court for the Northern District of California seeking to prevent the administration from terminating the DACA program. In a statement, the University of California expressed that it was suing "for wrongly and unconstitutionally violating the rights of the university and its students" because the rescission of the DACA program was "unconstitutional, unjust, and unlawful". Napolitano, who served as Secretary of Homeland Security from 2009 to 2013, noted that "Neither I, nor the University of California, take the step of suing the federal government lightly, especially not the very agency that I led", but that "It is imperative, however, that we stand up for these vital members of the UC community."

=== Discovery dispute ===
On October 17, 2017, the District Court ordered the government to provide "internal deliberative documents" behind the decision to rescind DACA to the Court by October 27, 2017. On October 20, 2017, the government filed a petition for mandamus in the U.S. Court of Appeals for the Ninth Circuit seeking to prevent the district court from forcing the government to provide the documents in question. On November 16, 2017, the Court of Appeals refused, by a vote of 2–1, to stop the district court's order requiring the government to provide the records. On December 1, 2017, the government filed a petition for mandamus and application for stay with the Supreme Court, seeking to prevent the district court from considering the documents. On December 8, 2017, the Supreme Court, by 5–4 vote, granted the application and temporarily halted the district court's order to provide the documents, and on December 20, 2017, the Supreme Court unanimously laid out guidelines for access to the documents in question.

=== Temporary relief ===
On January 9, 2018, U.S. District Judge William Alsup ordered the government to maintain the DACA program while the lawsuit was pending. Judge Alsup wrote that "the agency's decision to rescind DACA was based on a flawed legal premise" and noted that plaintiffs "have clearly demonstrated that they are likely to suffer serious, irreparable harm". The ruling ordered the government to renew deferred action for existing DACA recipients. However, Judge Alsup limited his ruling to those who have already been granted DACA, and did not order the government to accept applications from those who had not previously received DACA.

In response to Judge Alsup's ruling, on January 13, 2018, the government indicated in a statement that it would immediately begin accepting DACA renewal applications using the same forms as before the program had been rescinded.

On January 16, 2018, the government announced that it had filed an appeal to the United States Court of Appeals for the Ninth Circuit, and on January 18, the government filed a petition for certiorari before judgement with the Supreme Court, asking it to decide the case before the Ninth Circuit ruled on the appeal.

On February 26, 2018, the Supreme Court denied the government's petition, ordering that the Ninth Circuit should hear the appeal first. The Supreme Court's order had the effect of preventing the government from terminating DACA on March 5, 2018, as originally directed.

On May 15, 2018, the Ninth Circuit heard oral arguments in the case. However, on October 17, 2018, the U.S. Department of Justice (DOJ) informed the Circuit that the DOJ intended to seek certiorari from the Supreme Court if the Ninth Circuit did not issue a decision by October 31, 2018. After the Ninth Circuit failed to make a decision by that date, the DOJ, on November 5, 2018, for a second time filed a petition for certiorari before judgement with the Supreme Court. The Supreme Court took the unusual stance of taking no action on the request for many months. The court's inaction meant that the case will have to be heard during the following October 2020 term.

The Ninth Circuit ruled on November 8, 2018, upholding the injunction set by the District Court that blocked the government from rescinding DACA while the legal challenge continued in lower courts. The Circuit Court ruled that "plaintiffs are likely to succeed on their claim that the rescission of DACA—at least as justified on this record—is arbitrary, capricious, or otherwise not in accordance with law." Shortly thereafter, the Justice Department petitioned the Supreme Court to review the Ninth Circuit's decision.

== Supreme Court ==
On June 28, 2019, the Supreme Court granted certiorari, consolidating the case with Trump v. NAACP and McAleenan v. Vidal. Following Kevin McAleenan's departure as the acting Secretary of Homeland Security in November 2019 and replacement by Chad Wolf, the latter case was renamed Wolf v. Vidal.

The Court heard oral argument on November 12, 2019. Observers at the hearing stated that the Justices appeared to stay to their ideological lines, with the conservative majority likely to side with the Trump administration.

=== Decision ===
The Court delivered its opinion on June 18, 2020. In the 5–4 decision, the Court's majority determined that the decision to rescind the DACA program was "arbitrary and capricious" under the APA, and thus reversed the order.

The majority opinion was written by Chief Justice John Roberts and joined by Justices Ruth Bader Ginsburg, Stephen Breyer, and Elena Kagan in full and by Sonia Sotomayor in part. In the majority opinion, Roberts wrote "We do not decide whether DACA or its rescission are sound policies. 'The wisdom' of those decisions 'is none of our concern.' We address only whether the agency complied with the procedural requirement that it provide a reasoned explanation for its action. Here the agency failed to consider the conspicuous issues of whether to retain forbearance and what if anything to do about the hardship to DACA recipients. That dual failure raises doubts about whether the agency appreciated the scope of its discretion or exercised that discretion in a reasonable manner."

Justice Clarence Thomas wrote an opinion that joined the judgement in part and dissented in part, which was joined by Justices Samuel Alito and Neil Gorsuch. Thomas wrote that the majority decision "must be recognized for what it is: an effort to avoid a politically controversial but legally correct decision." Thomas further added "Today the majority makes the mystifying determination that this rescission of DACA was unlawful. In reaching that conclusion, the majority acts as though it is engaging in the routine application of standard principles of administrative law. On the contrary, this is anything but a standard administrative law case."

The Court's judgement remanded the three enjoined cases back to their respective lower courts for further review after either affirming, vacating or reversing the various decisions or orders as consistent with the Court's opinion. Roberts wrote "The appropriate recourse is therefore to remand to DHS so that it may reconsider the problem anew." The DHS would still be able to write an order or regulation to rescind DACA but would have to provide the necessary justification as required by the APA to validate its application.

=== Equal Protection Analysis ===
The respondents also argued that the DACA rescission violated the equal protection guarantee of the Fifth Amendment’s Due Process Clause. The parties disputed the framing of the claim and the plurality held that even if the claim were cognizable, the allegations were insufficient. Under the Arlington Heights standard, a plaintiff must raise a plausible inference that a “discriminatory purpose was a motivating factor” in the relevant policy decision.

The plurality rejected each of the respondents’ three factors offered as evidence discriminatory purpose. First, Chief Justice Roberts wrote, the rescission’s disparate impact on Latinos from Mexico, who make up 78% of DACA recipients, is expected because Latinos make up a large share of unauthorized immigrants. Therefore, Roberts wrote impact insufficient for a claim, “virtually any generally applicable immigration policy could be challenged on equal protection grounds.” Second, respondents pointed out that when DHS rescinded Deferred Action for Parents of Americans (DAPA) in June 2017, its memo stated that DACA would “remain in effect.” Because DHS rescinded DACA just three months later, respondents argued, the sequence of events shows that the decision was a sudden and irregular departure from the agency’s own stated position. Roberts wrote that a later decision to reconsider DACA was “a natural response to a newly identified problem” as the June 2017 DHS memo did not evaluate the merits or legality of the DACA program. Finally, respondents pointed to statements made by President Trump pre- and post-election. Roberts wrote the Trump statements were “remote in time and made in unrelated contexts” to prove discriminatory purpose of the rescission. He added that respondents did not identify any statement from Acting Secretary Elaine Duke, who was directly responsible for formally rescinding DACA in September 2017.

Justice Sotomayor concurred in the rest of the opinion invalidating the rescission based on APA but dissented from Part IV, writing the plurality disposition was premature and that she would have let respondents develop their equal protection claims on remand. She argued the complaints plausibly alleged discriminatory purpose, citing Trump’s statements about Mexican and Latino immigrants. Pre-election Trump statements in the respondent complaints include references to Mexican immigrants as “people that have lots of problems," “the bad ones,” and “criminals, drug dealers, [and] rapists.” Post-election 2017 statements in the complaints include Trump comparing undocumented immigrants to “animals” responsible for “the drugs, the gangs, the cartels, the crisis of smuggling and trafficking, [and] MS13.” She wrote that the plurality viewed the disparate impact in isolation rather than alongside those statements. Additionally, she wrote the June 2017 DHS memo was a commitment to DACA, and the rescission three months later was an abrupt change that “plausibly suggests that something other than questions about the legality of DACA.”

== Subsequent actions ==
In a separate challenge to the rescinding of the DACA, Casa De Maryland v. U.S. Dep't of Homeland Sec., the Fourth Circuit ruled in May 2019, also finding that the rescinding order was arbitrary and capricious and had vacated the order but remanded the case back to the United States District Court for the District of Maryland on matters of further review. While in jurisdiction there, the Supreme Court decision in Regents was issued. Because of the decision, District Court judge Paul W. Grimm issued orders on July 17, 2020, that required DHS to restore the DACA program to its pre-rescission status, prior to September 2017, which includes accepting new applicants, a step that DHS has not, as of July 2020, yet taken since the rescinding order had been issued. Acting Secretary of DHS, Chad Wolf, issued a memo at the end of July 2020 stating that the department should refuse all new requests under the project and other actions while the department evaluated the Supreme Court's ruling. As a result of an accounting action by the Government Accounting Office, Wolf's position as Acting Secretary was brought into question, and in November 2020, Judge Garaufis ruled that Kevin McAleenan, who had been named as Acting Secretary prior to Wolf, was never properly named to the title, and thus lacked the authority to pass that to Wolf in October 2019. Judge Garaufis thus ruled that Wolf's July memo was invalid, and ordered the DHS to resume the DACA program as it was, and to provide relief to those adversely affected by the temporary actions.

== Impact ==
John Yoo wrote in the National Review after the decision that from the majority opinion in this case, "the Constitution makes it easy for presidents to violate the law, but reversing such violations difficult — especially for their successors." Yoo argued in the essay that the original DACA and DAPA programs violated the president's authority over immigration law under the Constitution as it gave this power solely to Congress, but Obama had been able to push these into practice quickly, and the only way to reverse these was through the "slow Administrative Procedure Act" that lasted through much of Trump's term, even though Trump was trying, in Yoo's estimation, to return to the Constitutionally-appropriate status. Because of this, such a maneuver could be used by any president to implement procedures quickly that may be illegal or unconstitutional but would take several years to fully undo.

Trump since stated in interviews in July about pending immigration plan changes, including "We're working out the legal complexities right now, but I'm going to be signing a very major immigration bill as an executive order, which the Supreme Court now, because of the DACA decision, has given me the power to do that." Axios reported that they were told by White House staff that Trump and his advisors were very interested in Yoo's essay after its publication and which may be tied to the pending immigration orders.

== Reactions ==
The Trump administration justified its decision to remove DACA as unconstitutional overreach by the Obama administration and was a violation of the Administrative Procedure Act (APA) to defend the removal of DACA. However, critics pointed out that the government failed to provide a detailed policy rationale, which later became a significant issue in the Supreme Court ruling. The lack of transparency in the decision-making process led to legal challenges from universities, activism groups, and several states.

=== Public activism and media response ===
The removal of DACA generated widespread opposition, which led to coordinated responses from immigration activists, universities, businesses, and elected officials asking for the President to get involved and showing how the removal impacted the lives of DACA recipients and the economy. Organizations like United We Dream and the American Civil Liberties Union (ACLU) launched digital campaigns using hashtags such as #DefendDACA and #HomeIsHere to gain public support and pressure lawmakers into action. Major universities and tech companies, including Apple, Google, and Facebook, issued public statements condemning the rescission. Corporations also filed amicus briefs in support of DACA, arguing that terminating the program would have economic and social consequences.

The contrast in coverage emphasized the divided nature of the debate and opinion on the removal of DACA and its unconstitutionality. President Trump, during his campaign, had an initial strong stance against DACA and then softened his view on DACA recipients, urging Congress to take action to resolve the matter. As he stated, "My highest duty is to defend the constitution of the United States of America. At the same time, I do not favor punishing children...for the actions of their parents."

=== Misinformation ===
The debate around DACA also raised concerns about media ethics and misinformation by news outlets and social media:

- Some media outlets and political figures falsely suggested that DACA recipients were eligible for federal benefits or were linked to higher crime rates. These claims were debunked by fact-checkers, and it was confirmed that DACA recipients are ineligible for benefits like Medicaid, SNAP, and federal student aid. However, they may be eligible for state-level benefits that are considered essential for life and safety, and often these come from individual institutions. In addition, DACA recipients are required to have a clean criminal record to be eligible to apply and to continue to renew DACA. This includes no felony convictions, no significant misdemeanor convictions, or three or more misdemeanor convictions.
- Another common storyline suggested that DACA recipients had higher crime rates than native-born citizens, even after multiple studies showed that immigrants, both documented and undocumented, generally commit crimes at lower rates. Some misleading posts used out-of-context crime reports to fuel anti-immigration sentiment, and this again spread throughout social media.

== See also ==
- New York v. Trump (DACA)
- Presidency of Donald Trump
