= New York v. Trump (DACA) =

2017 American federal lawsuit on migrant detention

New York, et al v. Trump, et al
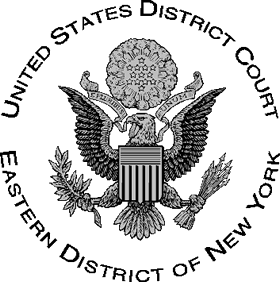
- Court: United States District Court for the Eastern District of New York
- Full case name: States of New York, Massachusetts, Washington, Connecticut, Delaware, District of Columbia, Hawaii, Illinois, Iowa, New Mexico, North Carolina, Oregon, Pennsylvania, Rhode Island, Vermont, and Virginia v. Donald Trump, in his official capacity as President of the United States; U.S. Department of Homeland Security; Elaine C. Duke, in her official capacity; U.S. Citizenship and Immigration Services; U.S. Immigration and Customs Enforcement; and the United States of America
- Defendants: Donald Trump, in his official capacity as President of the United States; U.S. Department of Homeland Security; Elaine C. Duke, in her official capacity; U.S. Citizenship and Immigration Services; U.S. Immigration and Customs Enforcement; and the United States of America
- Counsel for plaintiffs: Lourdes Maria Rosado
- Plaintiffs: States of New York, Massachusetts, Washington, Connecticut, Delaware, District of Columbia, Hawaii, Illinois, Iowa, New Mexico, North Carolina, Oregon, Pennsylvania, Rhode Island, Vermont, and Virginia

Court membership
- Judges sitting: Nicholas G. Garaufis; James Orenstein (Magistrate)

State of New York, et al. v. Trump et al. (No. 1:17-cv-05228-NGG-JO) was a lawsuit against the rescission implemented by the Trump administration of the Deferred Action for Childhood Arrivals (DACA) program. At issue are Fifth Amendment protections of due process, information use, and equal protection.

Plaintiffs claimed damages in the form of "discriminatory treatment based on their national origin, without lawful justification."

== Facts and prior history ==
The Deferred Action for Childhood Arrivals, or DACA, is a program that protected certain undocumented immigrants who came to the United States as children from arrest or detention based solely on their immigration status while the program was in effect. Obama administration Secretary of Homeland Security Janet Napolitano issued a memorandum establishing DACA on June 15, 2012. Participation was granted for two years with renewal possible. DACA grantees also got work authorizations and were eligible to receive Social Security, retirement, disability benefits, and, in certain states, benefits such as driver's licenses or unemployment insurance.

DACA became a campaign issue in the 2016 United States Presidential election. Republican nominee Donald Trump called for eliminating DACA, while Democratic nominee Hillary Clinton called for protection and expansion of the program. After Trump was elected President, the Acting Secretary of Homeland Security Elaine Duke rescinded the Napolitano memo on September 5, 2017, effectively rescinding DACA. The Trump administration then sent the program to Congress for rework within six months.

Following this action, the state of New York filed this lawsuit to maintain the protections extended to DACA grantees and to allow renewal and continued enrollment by eligible applicants.

== Case history ==
The case was reassigned to Judge Nicholas G. Garaufis, because it was related to Batalla Vidal et al. v. Baran et al., No. 1:16-cv-4756.

In late September 2017, the parties argued over the scope of discovery. On October 19, 2017, Judge Garaufis ordered that the Trump administration could not delay discovery, though he reduced the scope of required documents. On December 14, 2017, government lawyers argued that discovery was improper, but no immediate ruling was issued.

On June 18, 2020, the Supreme Court ruled 5–4 in the related case Department of Homeland Security v. Regents of the University of California that the Trump administration's attempt to terminate DACA was "arbitrary and capricious" under the Administrative Procedure Act. The Court vacated the rescission and remanded the matter back to the lower courts.

Following the Supreme Court's remand, the Trump administration issued a temporary memorandum via Acting DHS Secretary Chad Wolf limiting renewals to one year and blocking new applications. Plaintiffs in New York v. Trump and Batalla Vidal challenged the memorandum. On November 14, 2020, Judge Garaufis ruled that Wolf was not lawfully serving as Acting Secretary at the time he issued the memorandum, invalidating the rules.

On December 4, 2020, Judge Garaufis issued a final order directing the Department of Homeland Security to fully reinstate DACA under its original 2012 terms, requiring the government to accept first-time applications and restore two-year renewal periods, effectively concluding the district court proceedings for this litigation.

== See also ==
- Department of Homeland Security v. Regents of the University of California - 2020 Supreme Court ruling on the rescission of DACA
