= Thom Lambert =

American legal scholar

Thomas A. Lambert is an American legal scholar.

After graduating from Wheaton College in 1993 with a bachelor's degree, Lambert became an environmental policy analyst at the Center for the Study of American Business at Washington University in St. Louis. Lambert left the position to pursue a J.D. at University of Chicago Law School, which he earned in 1998. He clerked for Jerry Edwin Smith, then joined Sidley Austin in Chicago, before starting his teaching career at the University of Missouri School of Law in 2003. He is the Wall Chair in Corporate Law and Governance at MU Law, and was named a 2017 William T. Kemper Fellow.
