= James Ho =

American federal judge (born 1973)

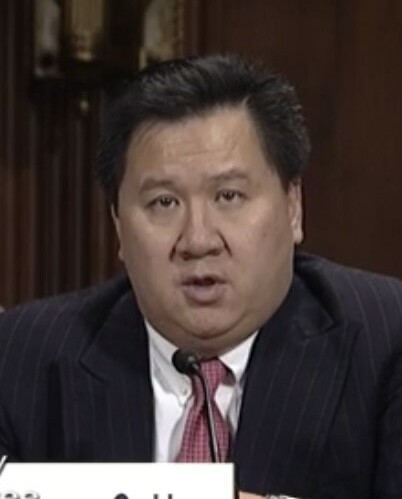

Judge of the United States Court of Appeals for the Fifth Circuit
- Incumbent
- Assumed office January 4, 2018
- Appointed by: Donald Trump
- Preceded by: Carolyn Dineen King

4th Solicitor General of Texas
- In office May 12, 2008 – December 9, 2010
- Governor: Rick Perry
- Preceded by: Ted Cruz
- Succeeded by: Jonathan F. Mitchell

Personal details
- Born: Ho Chiun-Yue; February 27, 1973 (age 53) Taipei, Taiwan
- Spouse: Allyson Newton (m. 2004)
- Children: 2
- Education: Stanford University (BA); University of Chicago (JD)

Chinese name
- Chinese: 何俊宇
Transcriptions
Standard Mandarin
- Hanyu Pinyin: Hé Jùnyǔ
- Wade–Giles: Ho^{2} Chün^{4}-yü^{3}
- IPA: [xɤ̌ tɕŷn.ỳ]
Southern Min
- Tâi-lô: Hô Tsùn-ú

James Chiun-Yue Ho (Chinese: 何俊宇; pinyin: Hé Jùnyǔ; born February 27, 1973) is an American lawyer and jurist serving as a United States circuit judge of the United States Court of Appeals for the Fifth Circuit. He was appointed in 2018 by President Donald Trump, becoming the Fifth Circuit's only Asian-American judge and the only judge to be an immigrant.

Born in Taiwan, Ho immigrated to the United States as a child and graduated from Stanford University and the University of Chicago Law School. He served as the Solicitor General of Texas from 2008 to 2010, becoming the first Asian-American to hold the position. He has been identified as a potential Supreme Court nominee for Donald Trump's second term.

== Early life and education ==
Ho was born on February 27, 1973, in Taipei, Taiwan, to So-Hwa and Steve Song-Shan Ho. His father was a doctor who specialized in obstetrics and gynecology. The family immigrated to the United States when Ho was a child, moving first to Long Island before settling in San Marino, California. He became a naturalized United States citizen at age nine.

Ho was educated at the Polytechnic School, a rigorous private school in Pasadena, where he became the editor-in-chief of the school newspaper, The Paw Print. He was a high school classmate of Leondra Kruger, who would later become a justice of the Supreme Court of California. Ho volunteered as an actor and dancer for school plays and briefly served as a football lineman. A classmate described Ho as "super-intense; he walked fast, laid out pages fast, and drove too fast, in a Ford Probe". After high school, Ho attended Stanford University, where he studied public policy, wrote for The Stanford Daily, and graduated with a Bachelor of Arts with honors in 1995.

From 1995 to 1996, Ho was a California Senate Fellow at California State University, Sacramento, and worked as a legislative aide to California state senator Quentin L. Kopp. He then attended the University of Chicago Law School, where he became an editor of the University of Chicago Law Review, joined the Federalist Society, and also served as an editor for The Green Bag. In 1998, Ho served as the executive editor of the Harvard Journal of Law & Public Policy. He graduated in 1999 with a Juris Doctor with high honors and membership in the Order of the Coif. Upon graduation, the law school awarded him its Ann Watson Barber Outstanding Service Award, given for "exceptional contributions to the quality of life at the Law School".

== Career ==
After law school, Ho was a law clerk to Fifth Circuit judge Jerry Edwin Smith from 1999 to 2000. From 2000 to 2001, he was in private practice at the Washington, D.C. office of the law firm Gibson Dunn, where he assisted partner Theodore Olson with his representation of George W. Bush in Bush v. Gore. From 2001 to 2003, Ho was an attorney in the United States Department of Justice's Civil Rights Division and Office of Legal Counsel. He was chief counsel to subcommittees of the Senate Judiciary Committee from 2003 to 2005 under Republican Senator John Cornyn. From 2005 to 2006, Ho was a law clerk to Supreme Court justice Clarence Thomas.

Ho returned to private practice at Gibson Dunn in its Dallas office from 2006 to 2008 and 2010 to 2017. From 2008 to 2010, he was the Solicitor General of Texas in the Office of the Attorney General of Texas, replacing Ted Cruz in that position. As Texas solicitor general, Ho led the state's lawsuits against the Obama administration.

Ho has worked as a volunteer attorney with the First Liberty Institute, a religious legal advocacy organization. He has held multiple positions as a member of the Federalist Society since 1996.

=== Federal judicial service ===
On September 28, 2017, President Donald Trump announced his intent to nominate Ho as a United States circuit judge to an undetermined seat on the United States Court of Appeals for the Fifth Circuit. Cruz had promoted Ho as a candidate for a vacancy on the court. On October 16, 2017, Trump sent Ho's nomination to the Senate. He was nominated to the seat vacated by Judge Carolyn Dineen King, who assumed senior status on December 31, 2013. On November 15, 2017, a hearing on his nomination was held before the Senate Judiciary Committee. On December 7, 2017, his nomination was reported out of committee by an 11–9 vote. On December 13, 2017, the United States Senate invoked cloture on his nomination by a 53–44 vote. On December 14, 2017, Ho's nomination was confirmed by a 53–43 vote. He received his judicial commission on January 4, 2018. He was sworn in by Justice Clarence Thomas at the private library of Texan real estate billionaire and Republican donor Harlan Crow.

On September 9, 2020, Trump included Ho on a list of potential nominees to the Supreme Court. Trump nominated Amy Coney Barrett, who was confirmed. Ho has again been identified as a potential Supreme Court nominee should a vacancy arise during Donald Trump's second term. Senator Josh Hawley (R-MO) stated in June 2024 that he believes Ho "has done a terrific job on the 5th [Circuit]" and that Ho is "principled" and "will be immune to the Greenhouse effect.” Senator Ted Cruz (R-TX) has also expressed support for Ho's elevation to the Supreme Court. Ho was named to the shortlist of presidential candidate Vivek Ramaswamy.

On September 29, 2022, Ho delivered a speech at a Federalist Society conference in Kentucky and said he would no longer hire law clerks from Yale Law School, which he said was plagued by "cancel culture" and students disrupting conservative speakers. Ho said Yale "not only tolerates the cancellation of views — it actively practices it", and he urged other judges to likewise boycott the school. United States Circuit Judge Elizabeth L. Branch of the United States Court of Appeals for the Eleventh Circuit confirmed her participation in the Yale boycott in a statement to National Review. Branch told the National Review that Ho raised "legitimate concerns about the lack of free speech on law school campuses, Yale in particular," and that she would not consider students from Yale for clerkships in the future.

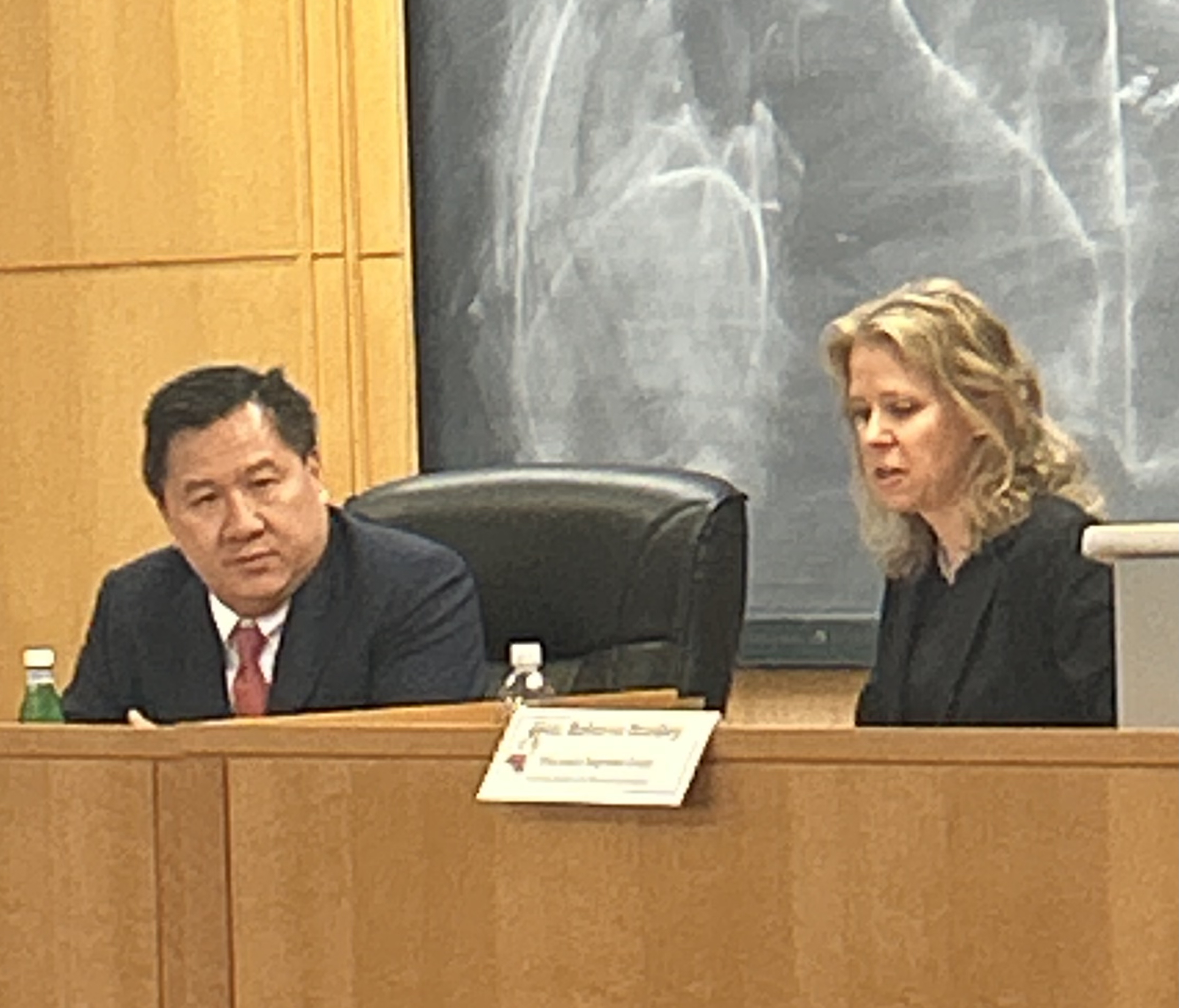
Ho (left), accompanied by Wisconsin Justice Rebecca Bradley, speaking during a 2024 event at the University of Wisconsin Law School

On May 6, 2024, Ho cosigned a letter alongside twelve federal judges, which he shared with CNN, vowing not to hire Columbia University law students or undergraduates for concerns that the university is not doing enough to counter students protesting the war in Gaza. Ho asked in the letter that the university should identify "students who engage in such conduct so that future employers can avoid hiring them. If not, employers are forced to assume the risk that anyone they hire from Columbia may be one of these disruptive and hateful students."

Ho has been outspoken defender of consular nonreviewability against illegal immigration, suggesting "a sovereign isn’t a sovereign if it can't control its borders" and that "[o]ur national objectives are undercut when states encourage illegal entry into the United States." He has stated that "[i]f only 'the political branches of the federal government' can decide if a state has been invaded, it effectively prohibits states from exercising their sovereign right of self-defense without federal permission." Ho has also defended the use of the term "alien", arguing it should not be seen as offensive, noting that "[i]t's a centuries-old legal term found in countless judicial decisions."

Ho was for many years a prominent defender of birthright citizenship for the children of undocumented immigrants, but shifted his views on the topic after Donald Trump was elected in 2024. In a 2006 article in The Green Bag, he wrote that the Fourteenth Amendment's Citizenship Clause protected "no less for children of undocumented persons than for descendants of Mayflower passengers," and he restated this position in a 2011 Wall Street Journal op-ed and a 2008 University of Richmond Law Review article. In a November 11, 2024, interview with law professor Josh Blackman at The Volokh Conspiracy, published a week after Trump's reelection, Ho qualified that position. He told Blackman: "No one to my knowledge has ever argued that the children of invading aliens are entitled to birthright citizenship," analogizing the situation to that of "unlawful combatants" after 9/11.

The remark connected the birthright citizenship question to Ho's earlier concurrence in United States v. Abbott, in which he had written that the southern border was the site of an "invasion." The shift was characterized by Slate as a walkback of his previous position, with commentator Mark Joseph Stern writing that Ho was "framing immigrants who lack permanent legal status as 'invading aliens.'" Originalist legal scholar Michael Ramsey, writing at the Tenth Amendment Center, said he was sympathetic to Ho's earlier writings on birthright citizenship and disagreed with Ho's new framing. The interview was subsequently cited by the Trump administration in its Supreme Court briefing in defense of the January 20, 2025, executive order restricting birthright citizenship. The Washington Post covered Ho's shift on birthright citizenship in an article on conservative judges who appeared to bringing attention to himself and auditioning to President Donald Trump to be appointed to the Supreme Court.

=== Notable opinions ===
On April 18, 2018, in his first written opinion as a Fifth Circuit judge, Ho dissented from a denial of a rehearing en banc in a case regarding a limit on campaign contributions. The Fifth Circuit three-judge panel upheld the constitutionality of a City of Austin ordinance setting an individual campaign contribution limit of $350 per election for candidates for mayor and city council, rejecting the plaintiff's claim that the limit violated the First Amendment. In his dissent, Ho argued the court "should have granted rehearing en banc and held that the Austin contribution limit violates the First Amendment" and asserted that "if there is too much money in politics, it's because there's too much government."

In 2020, Ho was a member of a panel that stayed a preliminary injunction entered by United States District Judge Samuel Frederick Biery Jr. that expanded the right to use a mail-in ballot to all Texas voters during the ongoing COVID-19 pandemic (allowing broader use of mail-in voting than under the Texas Election Code, which entitled only Texas voters over age 65 to vote absentee without an excuse). Ho wrote a separate concurring opinion favoring the state officials.

On September 9, 2021, Ho authored the majority opinion for an en banc panel in Helix Energy Solutions Group, Inc. v. Hewitt, interpreting a provision of the Fair Labor Standards Act of 1938. Ho was affirmed by the United States Supreme Court in an opinion authored by Justice Elena Kagan.

== Personal life ==
Ho's wife, Allyson Paix Newton Ho (née Newton, formerly Heidelbaugh), is a lawyer who is a partner in the Dallas office of Gibson Dunn and serves as co-chair of the firm's appellate practice group. The two met when Ho was a law clerk for Judge Jerry Edwin Smith in Houston, Texas, and Newton was a law student working for a Houston firm. They married on April 17, 2004. Newton earned a Ph.D. in English from Rice University and served as a law clerk to Justice Sandra Day O'Connor. She has argued four cases before the United States Supreme Court. They have twins, a daughter and a son.

== Selected publications ==
- Ho, James C. (2000). "Misunderstood Precedent: Andrew Jackson and the Real Case against Censure". Harvard Journal of Law and Public Policy. 24 (1): 283–307. ProQuest 235185777.
- Ho, James C. (2000). "Unnatural Born Citizens and Acting Presidents". Immigration and Nationality Law Review. 17: 575–585.
- Ho, James C.; Yoo, John C. (August 27, 2003). "The Status of Terrorists". Vanderbilt Journal of Transnational Law (136). Vanderbilt Law School: 1–20. SSRN 438123.
- Ho, James C. (Winter 2003). "International Law and the Liberation of Iraq". Texas Review of Law & Politics. 8 (2): 79–89.
- Ho, James C. (Summer 2004). "Ensuring the Continuity of Government in Times of Crisis: An Analysis of the On Going Debate in Congress". Catholic University Law Review. 53 (4): 1049–1072.
- Ho, James C. (Summer 2006). "Defining "American": Birthright Citizenship and the Original Understanding of the 14th Amendment" (PDF). The Green Bag. 9 (4): 366–378.
- Ho, James C. (Fall 2007). "Birthright Citizenship, the Fourteenth Amendment, and the Texas Legislature". Texas Review of Law & Politics. 12 (1): 161–167.
- Ho, James C. (March 1, 2008). "Birthright Citizenship, The Fourteenth Amendment, and State Authority" (PDF). University of Richmond Law Review. Allen Chair Symposium 2008: Immigration in the Twenty-First Century: Perspectives on Law and Policy. 42 (4).

== See also ==
- Donald Trump Supreme Court candidates
- List of Asian American jurists
- List of law clerks for the tenth seat of the Supreme Court of the United States

Legal offices
Preceded by Ted Cruz	Solicitor General of Texas; 2008–2010	Succeeded by Jonathan F. Mitchell
Preceded by Carolyn Dineen King	Judge of the United States Court of Appeals for the Fifth Circuit; 2018–present	Incumbent
