= Lee Kovarsky =

Lee B. Kovarsky is an American legal scholar.

Kovarsky was raised in Houston, and grew up as a fan of the Houston Astros Major League Baseball team. He graduated with a degree in political science and economics from Yale College. He then worked for a startup and planned to go to film school. Instead, he completed a J. D. at the University of Virginia School of Law, became a clerk for Jerry Edwin Smith, and worked in appellate law.

Kovarsky returned to academia with a three-year stint as acting assistant professor at the New York University School of Law, then joined the University of Maryland Francis King Carey School of Law for ten years before moving to the University of Texas School of Law in 2020, where he was later appointed Bryant Smith Chair in Law.

In 2020, Kovarsky was elected a member of the American Law Institute.
