= Aaron Nielson =

American legal scholar and lawyer (born 1980)

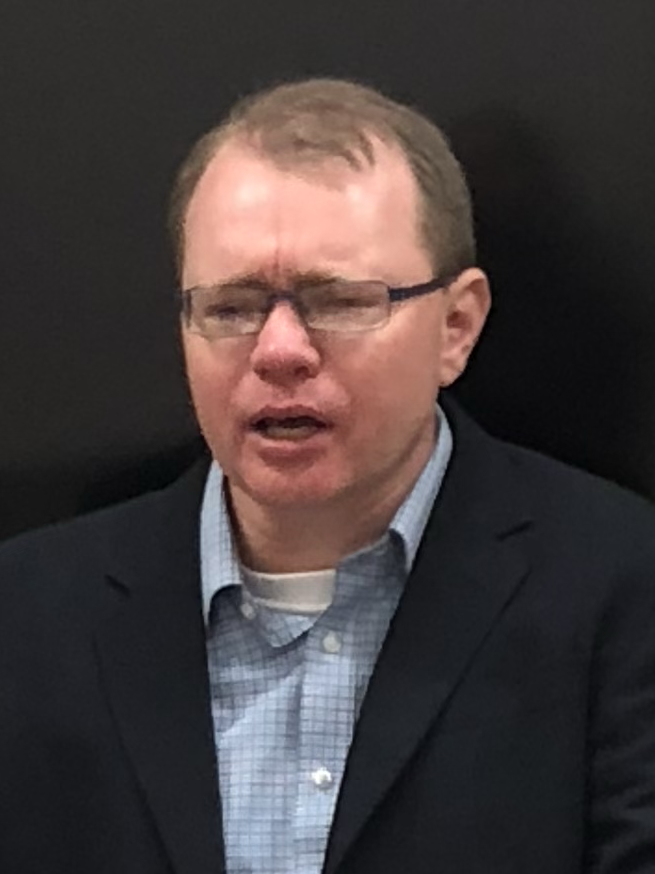
- Nielson in 2021

9th Solicitor General of Texas
- In office November 13, 2023 – July 7, 2025
- Appointed by: Ken Paxton
- Governor: Greg Abbott
- Preceded by: Judd Stone
- Succeeded by: William R. Peterson

Personal details
- Born: 1980 (age 45–46)
- Education: University of Pennsylvania (BA); Trinity Hall, Cambridge (LLM); Harvard University (JD)

Aaron Lloyd Nielson (born 1980) is an American lawyer and legal scholar who served as the solicitor general of Texas from 2023 to 2025. He is a professor of law at the University of Texas School of Law. He previously taught at Brigham Young University (BYU) and is an expert on the Administrative Procedure Act. In 2020, he was appointed by the U.S. Supreme Court to argue the case Collins v. Yellen (2021).

== Education ==
In 2003, Nielson graduated summa cum laude with a Bachelor of Arts in economics and political science from the University of Pennsylvania, where he won the university's Robert Holtz Memorial Award as the most outstanding graduate in the field of political science. He then received a scholarship to study in England at the University of Cambridge, receiving a Master of Laws (LL.M.) with first-class honours as a member of Trinity Hall in 2006 specializing in global competition and international commerce. Upon returning to the United States, Nielson earned his Juris Doctor (J.D.) degree, magna cum laude, from Harvard Law School in 2007.

== Career ==
After graduating from law school, Nielson became a law clerk for Judge Jerry Edwin Smith of the United States Court of Appeals for the Fifth Circuit from 2007 to 2008 and then clerked for Judge Janice Rogers Brown of the U.S. Court of Appeals for the District of Columbia Circuit from 2008 to 2009. In 2007, he entered private practice as an associate attorney at the law firm of Kirkland & Ellis in Washington, D.C., and was made a partner there in 2012 and became an associate professor at the J. Reuben Clark Law School of Brigham Young University in 2013. From 2014 to 2015, Nielson served as a law clerk for Justice Samuel Alito at the U.S. Supreme Court. Since then, he has been a scholar of administrative law, civil procedure, antitrust law, and the federal judiciary at BYU.

Nielson is an elected member of the American Law Institute. He is also an adjunct professor at the University of Texas School of Law. In 2021, he was awarded the Joseph Story Award of the Federalist Society for "excellence in legal scholarship, a commitment to teaching, a concern for students," and "significant public impact in a manner that advances the rule of law in a free society". On November 13, 2023, Texas attorney general Ken Paxton announced Nielson's appointment as the new Solicitor General of Texas to succeed Judd Stone. In order to assume the position, Nielson took a temporary one-year absence from teaching at BYU.

On June 27, 2025, Ken Paxton announced Nielson would leave the Texas solicitor general's office the following month to take a job as a professor at the University of Texas School of Law with tenure. Paxton also announced that William R. Peterson would succeed Nielson as the tenth solicitor general.

== Selected publications ==
- Nielson, Aaron (Winter 2010). "The Death of the Supreme Court's Certified Question Jurisdiction". Catholic University Law Review. 59 (2): 483–492.
- Nielson, Aaron; Jones, RonNell Andersen (June 2017). "Clarence Thomas the Questioner". Northwestern University Law Review. 111 (4): 1185–1203.
- Nielson, Aaron (November 2017). "Confessions of an "Anti-Administrativist"". Harvard Law Review. 131 (1): 1–12.
- Hemel, Daniel J.; Nielson, Aaron (2017). "Chevron Step One-and-a-Half". University of Chicago Law Review. 84 (2): 757–824.
- Nielson, Aaron (2021). "The Minor Questions Doctrine". University of Pennsylvania Law Review. 169: 1181–1233. Archived from the original on October 28, 2021.
