= Solicitor General of Texas =

Top appellate lawyer for the US state of Texas

- Incumbent; William R. Peterson since July 7, 2025
- Style: The Honorable
- Appointer: Attorney General of Texas
- Term length: No fixed term
- Formation: 1999
- First holder: Greg Coleman
- Website: Official website

The solicitor general of Texas is the top appellate solicitor or lawyer for the U.S. state of Texas. It is an appointed position in the Office of the Texas Attorney General that focuses on the office's major appellate cases. The majority of the cases handled by the solicitor are argued in the United States Supreme Court and the Supreme Court of Texas. However some cases within the solicitor's responsibilities are under the jurisdiction of the United States Court of Appeals for the Fifth Circuit and the state appellate courts. The solicitor represents the attorney general of Texas before the Supreme Court of Texas and other appellate courts, as needed. The Office of the Solicitor General writes most of the amicus briefs filed by the Texas attorney general's office.

== History ==
The position was created in January 1999 by Texas attorney general John Cornyn and was first filled by Greg Coleman. It is a similar position to solicitors in many states and is modeled after the solicitor general of the United States. The office has one principal deputy, two deputies, and other assistant solicitors general.

== Notable alumni of the Office of the Solicitor General ==
- J. Campbell Barker, Judge of the United States District Court for the Eastern District of Texas, 2019–present
- Jimmy Blacklock, Associate Justice of the Supreme Court of Texas, 2018–2025, Chief Justice of the Supreme Court of Texas, 2025 - Present
- Ted Cruz, U.S. senator from Texas, 2013–present
- S. Kyle Duncan, Judge of the United States Court of Appeals for the Fifth Circuit, 2018–present
- James C. Ho, Judge of the United States Court of Appeals for the Fifth Circuit, 2018–present
- Sean D. Jordan, Judge of the United States District Court for the Eastern District of Texas, 2019–present
- Jonathan F. Mitchell, Chairman of the Administrative Conference of the United States (Nominee)
- Andy Oldham, Judge of the United States Court of Appeals for the Fifth Circuit, 2018–present
- Lawrence VanDyke, Judge of the United States Court of Appeals for the Ninth Circuit, 2020–present, Solicitor General of Nevada (2015–2019), Solicitor General of Montana (2013–2014)

== List of solicitors general ==
The following is a table of solicitors general of Texas.

Parties

Republican (10) Democratic (0) No party (0)

No.	Portrait	Name	Took office	Left office	Attorney General
1		Greg Coleman	1999	2001	John Cornyn
2		Julie Parsley	2001	2002	John Cornyn
3		Ted Cruz	January 9, 2003	May 12, 2008	Greg Abbott
4		James C. Ho	May 2008	December 9, 2010	Greg Abbott
5		Jonathan F. Mitchell	December 10, 2010	January 5, 2015	Greg Abbott
6		Scott A. Keller	January 2015	September 10, 2018	Ken Paxton
7		Kyle D. Hawkins	September 10, 2018	February 1, 2021	Ken Paxton
8		Judd Stone	February 1, 2021	October 2023	Ken Paxton
9		Aaron L. Nielson	November 13, 2023	July 7, 2025	Ken Paxton
10		William R. Peterson	July 7, 2025	Present	Ken Paxton
