= Jonathan F. Mitchell =

American attorney (born 1976)

Jonathan Mitchell

5th Solicitor General of Texas
- In office December 10, 2010 – January 5, 2015
- Attorney General: Greg Abbott
- Preceded by: James Ho
- Succeeded by: Scott A. Keller

Personal details
- Born: Jonathan Franklin Mitchell; September 2, 1976 (age 50) Upland, Pennsylvania, U.S.
- Education: Wheaton College (BA); University of Chicago (JD)

Jonathan Franklin Mitchell (born September 2, 1976) is an American lawyer, academic, and legal theorist who served as the Solicitor General of Texas from 2010 to 2015. He has argued eight cases before the Supreme Court of the United States. Mitchell has served on the faculties of Stanford Law School, the University of Texas School of Law, the George Mason University School of Law, and the University of Chicago Law School. In 2018, he opened a private solo legal practice in Austin, Texas.

Mitchell devised the novel enforcement mechanism in the Texas Heartbeat Act, also known as Senate Bill 8 (or SB 8), which outlaws abortion after cardiac activity is detected and avoids judicial review by prohibiting government officials from enforcing the statute and empowering private citizens to bring lawsuits against those who violate it. On September 1, 2021, the Supreme Court of the United States refused to enjoin the enforcement of SB 8, marking the first time that a state had successfully imposed a pre-viability abortion ban since Roe v. Wade.

Mitchell also represented former president Donald Trump in the case Trump v. Anderson, when Colorado tried to exclude him from the 2024 presidential ballot.

== Early life and education ==
Mitchell was born and raised in Pennsylvania and is the oldest of seven brothers. He graduated from Wheaton College in 1998 with a B.A., summa cum laude. He then graduated from the University of Chicago Law School, where he was an articles editor for the University of Chicago Law Review, in 2001 with a J.D. degree with high honors and Order of the Coif membership.

== Career ==
After graduating from law school, Mitchell worked as a law clerk for Judge J. Michael Luttig of the U.S. Court of Appeals for the Fourth Circuit from 2001 to 2002 and for Supreme Court justice Antonin Scalia from 2002 to 2003. After clerking, Mitchell became an attorney-adviser in the Office of Legal Counsel of the United States Department of Justice, where he worked from 2003 through 2006.

After leaving the Department of Justice, Mitchell served as a visiting professor at the University of Chicago Law School from 2006 to 2008. He then worked as a professor at the George Mason University School of Law (now Antonin Scalia Law School) until his appointment as Solicitor General of Texas in 2010. After leaving the Texas Solicitor General's office in 2015, Mitchell served as the Searle Visiting Professor of Law at the University of Texas School of Law, before joining the Hoover Institution as a visiting fellow in 2015. Mitchell also served as a visiting professor of law at Stanford Law School before opening his own law firm in 2018.

Mitchell has published scholarly articles on textualism, national security law, criminal law and procedure, judicial review, American federalism, and the legality of stare decisis in Constitutional adjudication.

=== ACUS nomination ===
In 2017, President Donald Trump nominated Mitchell to chair the Administrative Conference of the United States (ACUS). Mitchell’s nomination was voted out of committee, but never received a vote on the Senate floor.

=== Supreme Court practice ===
Mitchell has argued eight times before the Supreme Court of the United States and authored the principal merits brief in 11 Supreme Court cases.

Mitchell has also written and submitted more than 20 amicus curiae briefs in the Supreme Court. In Dobbs v. Jackson Women's Health Organization (2022), Mitchell and Adam K. Mortara urged the Supreme Court to overrule Roe v. Wade, and their brief argued that overturning Roe should undermine and eventually lead to the reversal of other "lawless" court decisions such as Obergefell v. Hodges, which they claimed created a right to same-sex marriage. At the same time, Mitchell and Mortara distinguished and defended the right to interracial marriage recognized in Loving v. Virginia, and argued that the federal right to interracial marriage should be grounded in congressional statutes such as the Civil Rights Act of 1866 rather than court-created substantive due process doctrines.

Mitchell also submitted an amicus brief in Students for Fair Admissions v. President and Fellows of Harvard College (2023), which urged the Supreme Court to declare race-based affirmative action unlawful solely under Title VI of the Civil Rights Act of 1964, without reaching the "much closer question" concerning the constitutionality of affirmative action under the Equal Protection Clause.

On February 8, 2024, Mitchell represented former president Donald Trump before the Supreme Court in Trump v. Anderson, and urged the Court to reverse the Colorado Supreme Court's decision that declared Trump ineligible for the presidency under Section 3 of the 14th Amendment. In an unsigned per curiam opinion issued March 4, 2024, the Court unanimously ruled in favor of former President Trump, holding that Congress has the exclusive ability to enforce Section 3 of the Fourteenth Amendment.

=== Other Legal Activities ===
On July 2, 2024, Mitchell sued Northwestern University over its alleged use of race and sex preferences in faculty hiring. In this lawsuit, Mitchell is representing an organization called Faculty, Alumni, and Students Opposed to Racial Preferences (or FASORP), which litigates against race and sex preferences and opposes practices that subordinate academic merit to diversity considerations. The complaint accuses Northwestern University of violating numerous federal anti-discrimination statutes, including Title VI, Title IX, and 42 U.S.C. § 1981.

=== Senate Bill 8 ===
In 2021, the Texas legislature enacted the Texas Heartbeat Act or Senate Bill 8 (SB 8), which bans abortion at approximately six weeks of pregnancy and includes an unusual enforcement mechanism designed to insulate the law from judicial review. Rather than allowing state officials to enforce the ban, the statute authorizes private citizens to sue anyone who performs or assists a post-heartbeat abortion, while forbidding the state and its officers to enforce the law in any way. By designing the statute in this manner, the legislature sought to make it impossible for abortion providers to challenge SB 8 in pre-enforcement lawsuits.

On September 1, 2021, the Supreme Court of the United States refused to enjoin the enforcement of SB 8 on account of the “complex and novel antecedent procedural questions” presented by this enforcement mechanism. The courts eventually ruled that abortion providers could not challenge the constitutionality of SB 8 in pre-enforcement lawsuits; they must instead wait to be sued in state court by a private individual and assert their constitutional claims as a defense in those state-court proceedings. News outlets reported that Mitchell designed the enforcement mechanism that allowed SB 8 to evade judicial review and outlaw abortion in Texas despite the statute’s incompatibility with Roe v. Wade.

SB 8's efforts to stymie judicial review have been a matter of intense controversy. Supreme Court Justice Sonia Sotomayor denounced the statute as “a breathtaking act of defiance” that hinders the judiciary from counteracting a “flagrantly unconstitutional law”, while anti-abortion commentators have praised the statute for its novel design and its successful circumvention of Roe v. Wade. The success of SB 8 was a major blow to Roe v. Wade, as it enabled other states to ban abortion and evade judicial review by copying the statute's novel enforcement mechanism.

=== Publications ===
- The Writ-of-Erasure Fallacy, 104 Va. L. Rev. 934 (2018).
- Textualism and the Fourteenth Amendment, 69 Stan. L. Rev. 1237 (2017).
- Remembering the Boss, 84 U. Chi. L. Rev. 2291 (2017).
- Commentary, Capital Punishment and the Courts, 120 Harv. L. Rev. F. 269 (2017).
- Judicial Review and the Future of Federalism, 49 Ariz. St. L. J. 1091 (2017).
- Stare Decisis and Constitutional Text, 110 Mich. L. Rev. 1 (2011).
- Reconsidering Murdock: State-Law Reversals as Constitutional Avoidance, 77 U. Chi. L. Rev. 1335 (2010).
- Legislating Clear-Statement Regimes in National-Security Law, 43 Ga. L. Rev. 1059 (2009).
- Apprendi’s Domain, 2006 Sup. Ct. Rev. 297.
- Why Was Roe v. Wade Wrong?, in Geoffrey R. Stone and Lee Bollinger, eds., Roe v. Dobbs: The Past, Present, and Future of a Constitutional Right to Abortion (Oxford 2023).

== See also ==
- List of law clerks for the ninth seat of the Supreme Court of the United States

Legal offices
Preceded by James C. Ho	Solicitor General of Texas; 2010–2015	Succeeded by Scott A. Keller
