= National Security Law of the United States =

Field of law

The national security law of the United States is a field of study that deals with the balance between liberty and security in American society.

== Sources of law ==
=== United States Constitution ===
The United States Constitution grants extensive national security powers to both Congress and the President of the United States. Article I grants Congress authority to "declare War, grant Letters of Marque and Reprisal, and make Rules concerning Captures on Land and Water." Congress is also empowered to "raise and support Armies," and "provide and maintain a Navy." Article II designates the President as the "Commander in Chief".

=== International Law ===
International law can have a domestic effect when incorporated by the Supremacy Clause of the Constitution. Additional fields of international law such as the right to wage war (jus ad bellum) and law of armed conflict/international humanitarian law (jus in bello) also affect this field of study.

=== Statutes ===
Various statutes are applicable in the national security law field including, but not limited to:

- War Powers Resolution
- Patriot Act
- International Emergency Economic Powers Act
- Export Administration Act of 1979

=== Common Law ===
There are a litany of Supreme Court and lower court cases which affect national security law. The landmark case that deals with separation of powers between Congress and the President is Youngstown Sheet & Tube Co. v. Sawyer, 343 U.S. 579 (1952), also commonly referred to as The Steel Seizure Case, in which the United States Supreme Court limited the power of the President of the United States to seize private property in the absence of either specifically enumerated authority under Article Two of the United States Constitution or statutory authority conferred on him by Congress. It was a "stinging rebuff" to President Harry Truman.
Justice Jackson's concurring opinion is often quoted as it divided Presidential authority vis-à-vis Congress into three categories (in descending order of legitimacy):

- Cases in which the President was acting with express or implied authority from Congress
- Cases in which Congress had thus far been silent, referred to as a 'zone of twilight'
- Cases in which the President was defying congressional orders (the "third category")

== See also ==
- Privacy law
- Law of war and International humanitarian law
