= Whole Woman's Health v. Jackson =

- Supreme Court of the United States

Argued November 1, 2021 Decided December 10, 2021
- Full case name: Whole Woman's Health et al. v. Austin Reeve Jackson, Judge, District Court of Texas, 114th District, et al.
- Docket no.: 21-463
- Citations: 595 U.S. 30 (more) 142 S. Ct. 522; 211 L. Ed. 2d 316; 2021 U.S. LEXIS 6144
- Argument: Oral argument
- Decision: Opinion

Case history
- Prior: Motion to dismiss denied, 1:21-cv-00616-RP (W.D. Tex. 2021); Administrative stay of proceedings granted, 21-50792 (5th Cir. 2021); Emergency motion to vacate stay denied, 21-50792 (5th Cir. 2021); Application for injunctive relief denied, No. 21A24 (594 U.S. ___ 2021); Stay of proceedings granted, 21-50792 (5th Cir. 2021)

Holding
- Abortion providers cannot sue state-court judges, court clerks, or the state's Attorney General in a pre-enforcement effort to stop the filing of private civil-enforcement lawsuits against the providers.

Court membership
- Chief Justice John Roberts Associate Justices Clarence Thomas · Stephen Breyer; Samuel Alito · Sonia Sotomayor; Elena Kagan · Neil Gorsuch; Brett Kavanaugh · Amy Coney Barrett

Case opinions
- Majority: Gorsuch (except as to Part II–C), joined by Thomas, Alito, Kavanaugh, Barrett
- Plurality: Gorsuch (Part II–C), joined by Alito, Kavanaugh, Barrett
- Concur/dissent: Thomas
- Concur/dissent: Roberts, joined by Breyer, Sotomayor, Kagan
- Concur/dissent: Sotomayor, joined by Breyer, Kagan

Laws applied
- U.S. Const. art. III sec. 2 clause 1, amend. XI

Whole Woman's Health v. Jackson, 595 U.S. 30 (2021), was a United States Supreme Court case brought by Texas abortion providers and abortion rights advocates that challenged the constitutionality of the Texas Heartbeat Act, a law that outlaws abortions after six weeks. The Texas Heartbeat Act prohibits state officials from enforcing the ban but authorizes private individuals to enforce the law by suing anyone who performs, aids, or abets an abortion after six weeks. The law was structured this way to evade pre-enforcement judicial review because lawsuits challenging the constitutionality of state statutes are typically brought against state officials who are charged with enforcing the law, as the state itself cannot be sued under the doctrine of sovereign immunity.

The case centered on whether a state can insulate its laws from pre-enforcement judicial review in this manner by authorizing private individuals to enforce the law while forbidding public enforcement by state officials. On December 10, 2021, the Supreme Court ruled that abortion providers could not sue state-court judges, court clerks, or the state's Attorney General in an effort to stop the filing of private civil-enforcement lawsuits. The Court also held that the abortion providers' claims against state licensing officials could proceed past the motion-to-dismiss stage.

== Background ==
The Texas Heartbeat Act, also referred to as Senate Bill 8 or SB 8 for short, is a law enacted by the Republican majorities in the 87th Texas Legislature during its regular session that prohibits abortion, including in cases of rape and incest, 6 weeks into a woman's pregnancy.

The Texas law is novel and unique in that it prohibits public enforcement by state actors and instead creates an exclusive mechanism of civil enforcement by private individuals. This was motivated by a desire to avoid ordinary constitutional challenges to restrictive state abortion laws against state officials in federal court. The law was written in a manner to insulate state officials from being the target of lawsuits challenging its constitutionality under the Ex parte Young exception to the sovereign immunity of states in federal court.

=== Previous litigation ===
Shortly before the law took effect on September 1, with the state defendants' appeal pending in the Fifth Circuit, the plaintiffs sought emergency relief in the Supreme Court of the United States in the form of an injunction pending appeal. The Supreme Court denied the request, and issued a collection of dissenting statements by individual members along with its order, which shed light on the divergent views on the court.

Although the majority denied instant relief, and thus allowed the Texas Heartbeat Act to go into effect, the court was careful to note that they were not rendering an opinion on the constitutionality of SB 8, and that such challenges could proceed in lower courts, including state courts. Legal challenges to WWH v. Jackson, along with the federal government's case against the state in United States v. Texas, continued, and on October 22, 2021, the Supreme Court again denied instant relief, but fast-tracked both to be heard on November 1, 2021.

=== Concurrent litigation ===
==== State court litigation ====
The Texas law underlying this case has been heavily criticized, as it is believed to violate the constitutional right to privacy under the Fourteenth Amendment, established by the landmark Supreme Court decisions in Roe v. Wade and Planned Parenthood v. Casey. In Roe, the Supreme Court held that states may not regulate abortions during the first trimester of pregnancy. In Casey, the Court established the undue burden test. The removal of state officials as enforcement agents in SB 8 is seen as a means to work around Roe v. Wade, and if upheld, would allow other states to take similar approaches to regulate abortions within the first trimester. Organizations like the ACLU and Planned Parenthood stood ready to challenge the law in court. On September 4, 2021, a Texas state judge granted an ex parte temporary restraining order shielding clinics from SB 8 lawsuits by Texas Right to Life for fourteen days. This was followed by an Agreed Temporary Injunction on September 13, 2021.

More than a dozen lawsuits brought by abortion providers and advocates are pending in state district courts in Travis County, Texas. Trial court proceedings were put on hold for some time by the Texas Multi-District Litigation Panel on motion by Defendant Texas Right to Life, pending a decision on whether to consolidate these cases. The cases were subsequently assigned to a retired judge and a hearing on motions for summary judgment and cross-motions to dismiss was held on November 10, 2021.

==== Dobbs v. Jackson Women's Health Organization ====
Prior to the bill's enactment, the Supreme Court had granted review in Dobbs v. Jackson Women's Health Organization, a case over a Mississippi abortion law blocking abortions after the fifteenth week, which is set to be heard in December 2021. Following the Supreme Court's refusal to block Texas's law, numerous friends-of-the-court briefs were submitted to support the position of abortion clinics in Dobbs. Texas Right to Life likewise weighed in with an amicus brief by Jonathan Mitchell.

==== United States v. Texas ====
The Biden administration via the Department of Justice filed suit in the name of the United States against Texas, which was transferred to the same federal district judge in Austin, Texas, who presides over WWH v. Jackson. A three-hour hearing by video conference on the DOJ's application for a preliminary injunction against enforcement of the Texas Heartbeat Act by state and private actors took place on October 1, 2021. Judge Pitman did not immediately issue a ruling, however. The case is United States v. State of Texas, Civil Action No. 1:21-cv-00796-RP, in the U.S. District Court for the Western District of Texas.

On October 6, 2021, Judge Pitman granted the DOJ's application for a preliminary injunction stopping the state judiciary from accepting, hearing, and adjudicating SB8 claims, and requiring notices to be posted on court websites, which Texas immediately appealed. On October 8, 2021, a panel of the Fifth Circuit granted the State's emergency motion for an administrative stay of Judge Pitman's preliminary injunction order.

The federal government petitioned the Supreme Court again to place a preliminary injunction on enforcement of the law. On October 22, 2021, the Supreme Court refused to grant the stay, but agreed to fast track both United States v. Texas and WWH v. Jackson for oral arguments on November 1, 2021. The Supreme Court in the government's case will review the government's standing. On the same day of issuing its decision for WWH, the Supreme Court dismissed the case as improvidently granted.

== First phase ==
=== Lower courts ===
Following the law's enactment in May 2021, several abortion clinics and their proponents filed a preemptive federal lawsuit in the Western District of Texas to block enforcement of the law prior to its September 1, 2021, enforcement date. The plaintiffs named Texas' attorney general Ken Paxton, a Texas state district court judge (Austin Reeve Jackson) and his court clerk, various Texas state officials involved in medical licensing that had a role in SB 8's enforcement, and one private individual as defendants, following public statements from the private individual of their intent to seek a civil suit under the new law once it came into effect. In their suit, the plaintiffs argued that state judges, clerks, and other officials were not exempt from becoming defendants due to the Ex Parte Young doctrine, an exception to sovereign immunity when state officials have "some connection with the enforcement of the act". The abortion groups sought injunctive relief against all respondents, as well as against all state judges and clerks, to enjoin private enforcement actions under SB 8. The state judge and other state defendants responded by asserting their sovereign immunity defined in SB 8. District judge Robert Pitman denied the respondents' request to dismiss on August 25, 2021, stating that the state officials were subject to Ex parte Young exemptions, since the judges and clerks were central to enforcement of SB 8.

The state respondents brought their immediate appeal to the U.S. Court of Appeals for the Fifth Circuit. The Fifth Circuit issued an order on August 27, 2021, putting on hold all further proceedings in the district court, including a scheduled hearing on the plaintiffs' request for a preliminary injunction, pending resolution of the immunity issues. The Fifth Circuit ruled in part of a standing principle in that Circuit from Bauer v. Texas (2003) which decided that "The requirement of a justiciable controversy is not satisfied where a judge acts in his adjudicatory capacity", thus exempting several of the state officials from the Ex parte Young issues. The defendants' immunity would deprive federal courts of jurisdiction and would prevent them from determining the merits of the constitutional arguments.

=== Supreme Court ===
On August 30, 2021, the Center for Reproductive Rights filed an emergency application with the Supreme Court of the United States, seeking to block the Act from going into effect. The Whole Woman's Health v. Jackson dispute did not reach the Supreme Court in the regular manner after an adverse decision on the merits by a circuit court of appeals. Instead, the plaintiffs sought emergency relief directly from the Supreme Court that the Fifth Circuit would not provide on an expedited basis. In the Supreme Court, the plaintiffs' application was accorded shadow docket treatment, meaning that there was no full briefing on the merits and no oral argument.

The Supreme Court denied the motion to an emergency application via order on September 1, 2021, nearly 24 hours after the Act had come into force. The unsigned statement denying the motion stressed that it did not preclude other legal challenges in lower federal or Texas state courts. Four members of the court, Chief Justice John Roberts and the court's more liberal members, Justices Stephen Breyer, Elena Kagan, and Sonia Sotomayor, all wrote or joined dissents. In her dissent, Justice Sotomayor wrote that "presented with an application to enjoin a flagrantly unconstitutional law engineered to prohibit women from exercising their constitutional rights and evade judicial scrutiny, a majority of justices have opted to bury their heads in the sand". The Supreme Court's procedural order and accompanying rationale in this case did not directly overrule the court's landmark Roe v. Wade precedent, but has been viewed as a threat to it. In its order disposing of the application for extraordinary relief, the court explicitly avoided deciding whether the Texas law was constitutional or not, leaving that question open for further litigation. The court also expressed doubts whether the novel issues raised by the Texas Heartbeat Act could be litigated in a federal action against state officials.

== Second phase ==
=== Fifth Circuit ===
A motions panel of the Fifth Circuit ruled on September 10, 2021, subsequently rejecting the proposition that Texas state judges and their clerks are proper defendants in an action under Section 1983 of the Civil Rights Act or under the Ex Parte Young exception to sovereign immunity. The panel ruled that the state officials listed in the defendants lack any "enforcement connection" to SB 8. Separately, the Fifth Circuit panel also ruled in favor of the private individual, maintaining a stay of proceedings of the case within the district court while they expedited the case for further review.

=== Supreme Court ===
The plaintiffs petitioned the Supreme Court again to place a preliminary injunction on enforcement of the law. On October 22, 2021, the Supreme Court refused to grant the stay, but agreed to fast track WWH v. Jackson for oral arguments on November 1, 2021, alongside those of United States v. Texas. The Court will review the constitutionality of the law within the scope of WWH v. Jackson, specifically on whether the law insulates state officials from being defendants of lawsuits. Oral arguments related to WWH v. Jackson focused on the chilling effect the law has had since no abortions had taken place in the state since the Act came into enforcement, and without any legal action under the Act, there would be no way to provide federal review of the law. Further, the Justices considered if the Texas bill could be used as a template for other states to design laws to allow public restriction of other rights like gun control or free speech.

The Court issued its decision on December 10, 2021, which reversed parts of the Circuit Court's decision while upholding others, and remanding the case to the Fifth Circuit. The Court was split on which defendants should be kept or removed from Whole Woman's Health lawsuit, with multiple partial concurrences and partial dissents in addition to the majority opinion from Justice Neil Gorsuch. Gorsuch wrote "The Court granted certiorari before judgment in this case to determine whether, under our precedents, certain abortion providers can pursue a pre-enforcement challenge to a recently enacted Texas statute. We conclude that such an action is permissible against some of the named defendants but not others." The decision did not make any statement on the constitutionality of SB8, allowing the law to remain in enforcement.

The Court decided 8–1 to allow the lawsuits to continue against those state officials involved in the medical licensing as they had an active role in enforcing SB 8. Justice Clarence Thomas was the sole dissent to this part of the decision, believing that not even the medical licensing staff should be subject to the lawsuit, stating "S. B. 8's supporters are under greater threat of litigation than its detractors."

The Court was split 5–4 in dismissing Paxton and state judicial system clerks from the Whole Woman's Health lawsuit. Chief Justice John Roberts wrote the partial dissent to this part of the decision, joined by Justices Stephen Breyer, Sonia Sotomayor, and Elena Kagan. Roberts believed the suits against state officials should continue, stating "'The clear purpose and actual effect of S. B. 8 has been to nullify this Court's rulings. It is, however, a basic principle that the Constitution is the 'fundamental and paramount law of the nation,' and '[i]t is emphatically the province and duty of the judicial department to say what the law is.' [Marbury v. Madison, 1 Cranch 137, 177 (1803)]. Indeed, '[i]f the legislatures of the several states may, at will, annul the judgments of the courts of the United States, and destroy the rights acquired under those judgments, the constitution itself becomes a solemn mockery.' [United States v. Peters, 5 Cranch 115, 136 (1809)]. The nature of the federal right infringed does not matter; it is the role of the Supreme Court in our constitutional system that is at stake."

The Court was unanimous in dismissing the lawsuit against the private individual who had threatened to sue under SB8, as during litigation, this individual had testified they no longer had any intent to file suit.

Justice Sotomayor wrote a dissent in part, joined by justices Breyer and Kagan, arguing that the Court should have rendered SB8 unconstitutional as it provides a "model for nullifying federal rights" for other states. She wrote "The Court should have put an end to this madness months ago, before S. B. 8 first went into effect. It failed to do so then, and it fails again today." She concluded "By foreclosing suit against state-court officials and the state attorney general, the Court effectively invites other States to refine S. B. 8's model for nullifying federal rights. The Court thus betrays not only the citizens of Texas, but also our constitutional system of government."

== Third phase ==
The plaintiffs requested on December 13 that the Court's formal mandate be issued immediately, rather than waiting the default 25 days, and that it be issued directly to the District Court (to Judge Pitman, who had previously ruled for the plaintiffs). The remaining state defendants requested that the mandate instead issue after the normal period and to the Fifth Circuit (where the panel had ruled for the defendants, and where they could seek to certify an issue in the case to the Texas Supreme Court). On December 16, Justice Gorsuch granted the plaintiffs' request for an expedited mandate but issued the mandate to the Fifth Circuit as requested by the defendants.

Justice Gorsuch's opinion had stated that "it appears Texas law imposes on the licensing-official defendants a duty to enforce a law that 'regulate[s] or prohibit[s] abortion,' a duty expressly preserved by S. B. 8's saving clause. Of course, Texas courts and not this one are the final arbiters of the meaning of state statutory directions." On this point, Gorsuch was writing for a four-justice plurality (as Thomas did not join part II-C), but the four justices in the Roberts concurrence/dissent also agreed that those officials had enforcement authority.

On remand, the Fifth Circuit (by a 2–1 vote) on January 17 certified to the Supreme Court of Texas the state-law question of whether any of the state defendants had enforcement authority regarding SB 8, second-guessing the 8–1 conclusion of the U.S. Supreme Court that the Texas Medical Board at least "appears" to have enforcement authority.

Before this order, the plaintiffs sought a writ of mandamus on January 3 from the U.S. Supreme Court to order the Fifth Circuit to instead remand the case to the District Court. On January 22, the U.S. Supreme Court denied the petition in In re Whole Woman's Health, 595 U.S. ___ (2022), over dissents by Breyer (joined by Sotomayor and Kagan) and Sotomayor (joined by Breyer and Kagan).

On certification, the Supreme Court of Texas unanimously held on March 11 that none of the state defendants has authority to enforce the statute, agreeing with Justice Thomas's lone opinion and rejecting the contrary reading (an Erie guess) of the other 8 justices as an erroneous interpretation of Texas law. Accordingly, on April 26 the Fifth Circuit remanded the case and ordered all remaining government defendants to be dismissed for lack of enforcement authority, effectively ending the case without a ruling blocking SB 8.

Two months later, on June 24, the U.S. Supreme Court decided Dobbs v. Jackson Women's Health Organization, overruling Roe v. Wade (1973). As such, SB 8's approximately six-week ban on abortions was superseded by other Texas abortion bans starting from conception. SB 8's $10,000 civil penalties have never been enforced against anyone, but the possibility of SB 8 lawsuits deterred most abortions in Texas even before Roe and Planned Parenthood v. Casey were overruled.

== See also ==
- Whole Woman's Health v. Hellerstedt, 579 U.S. 582 (2016)
