= The Green Bag (1997) =

Legal journal

- Discipline: Law
- Language: English

Publication details
- History: 1997–present
- Publisher: Green Bag Press (United States)
- Frequency: Quarterly
- Open access: Delayed

Standard abbreviations
- Bluebook: Green Bag 2d
- ISO 4: Green Bag

Indexing
- ISSN: 1095-5216

Links
- Journal homepage; Online access

The Green Bag: An Entertaining Journal of Law (second series) is a quarterly legal journal dedicated to publishing "good writing" about the law. It was established in 1997 by three former classmates at the University of Chicago Law School: Ross Davies, David Gossett, and Montgomery Kosma. While calling itself an "entertaining" journal, it is not strictly a journal of humor and unserious work. Rather, The Green Bag aims to publish articles that are brief, readable, and meant to provoke discussion.

Since 2003, The Green Bag has issued bobblehead dolls depicting justices of the Supreme Court of the United States, both present and past.

In addition to the periodical, the Green Bag Press publishes other works of legal interest, including The Green Bag Almanac and Reader, an annual collection of the year's best legal writing, In Chambers Opinions by the Justices of the Supreme Court of the United States, and The Journal of Law. In addition, every year the journal releases a list of outstanding legal writing. From 2013 to 2015, the Green Bag's website and Twitter feed also included a weekly "lunchtime law quiz" feature.

The Green Bag, second series was inspired by the original Green Bag, a legal magazine that was published between 1889 and 1914, and popular during the Progressive Era. Its offerings included a series of articles contributed by David Werner Amram, which formed the substance of his 1905 book, Leading Cases in the Bible. In these, Amram approached the Bible in a spirit of free scientific inquiry and illuminated the legal problems involved even indirectly in the biblical narrative. The striking originality and charming style of the book was of interest to students of both the law and the Bible.
