= Stephen Henderson (legal scholar) =

Stephen E. Henderson is an American legal scholar.

Henderson earned a Bachelor of Science in electrical engineering from the University of California, Davis in 1995, and completed a J. D. at Yale Law School in 1999. He holds the Judge Haskell A. Holloman Professorship of Law at the University of Oklahoma College of Law. Henderson is an elected member of the American Law Institute.
