= Shadow docket =

U.S. Supreme Court procedure

Internal memos from the Supreme Court of the United States regarding the shadow docket in 2016, via the New York Times

The shadow docket (also known as the interim docket, the emergency docket, or the non-merits docket) (Note: Additional names include the "orders docket", "intermediate docket", "interim relief docket", "non-merits orders", "equity docket", or "emergency orders", as relevant. Definitions of these terms may vary, such as about whether they include typical petitions for certiorari and non-contentious requests like extensions of time for filing.) refers to motions and orders in the Supreme Court of the United States in cases which have not yet reached final judgment, (Note: Or an interlocutory order that is appealable.) decision on appeal, and oral argument. This term especially refers to stays and injunctions (preliminary relief), but also includes summary decisions and grant, vacate, remand (GVR) orders. The phrase shadow docket was first used in this context in 2015 by University of Chicago law professor William Baude.

The shadow docket is a break from ordinary procedure. Such cases receive very limited briefings and are typically decided a week or less after an application is filed. The process generally results in short, unsigned rulings. In contrast, merits cases take months, include extensive briefing and public oral argument, and result in lengthy written opinions detailing the reasoning of the majority and of any concurring and dissenting justices.

The shadow docket is used when the court believes an applicant will suffer "irreparable harm" if its request is not immediately granted. Historically, the shadow docket was rarely used for rulings of serious legal or political significance. However, beginning in February 2016, it has been increasingly used for consequential rulings, especially for requests by the Department of Justice for emergency stays of lower-court rulings. The practice has been criticized for various reasons, including for bias, lack of transparency, and lack of accountability.

The Roberts Court has made unprecedented use of the shadow docket to issue major rulings and sidestep ordinary procedures. The Roberts Court's decision in the procedural history of West Virginia v. EPA to use the shadow docket to halt the Obama administration's Clean Power Plan (which Roberts described in internal deliberations as causing substantial and irreversible harm to American industry) has been described as the case that gave birth to the court's use of the shadow docket. Since then, the Roberts Court used the shadow docket to halt the Biden administration's activities and to enable the second Trump administration to enact controversial policies. In 2026, the Roberts court issued more orders on the shadow docket (63) than the traditional merits docket (56).

== Terminology ==
The term "shadow docket" was coined in 2015 by William Baude, who wrote:

Outside of the merits cases, the Court issued a number of noteworthy rulings which merit more scrutiny than they have gotten. In important cases, it granted stays and injunctions that were both debatable and mysterious. The Court has not explained their legal basis and it is not even clear to what extent individual Justices agree with those decisions. ... As the orders list comes to new prominence, understanding the Court requires us to understand its non-merits work – its shadow docket.

The term has been used by some justices themselves, with Justice Elena Kagan calling the Court's "shadow-docket decision-making" "every day becom[ing] more unreasoned, inconsistent, and impossible to defend" in a dissent to a denial of an application for injunctive relief in the case Whole Woman's Health v. Jackson (2021). The phrase itself has been criticized by Justice Samuel Alito, who called it "sinister" in a university speech and saying it was "used to portray the court as having been captured by a dangerous cabal that resorts to sneaky and improper methods to get its ways", and by senators, with Ted Cruz, a former solicitor general of Texas, saying: "Shadow docket, that is ominous. Shadows are really bad, like really, really bad".

Justices have proposed other labels for the practice. In September 2025, Justice Brett Kavanaugh told a Sixth Circuit judicial conference that "the term 'interim docket' best captures it". Justice Amy Coney Barrett, joined by Roberts and Justice Kavanaugh, wrote in Mirabelli v. Bonta (2026) that "[i]nterim applications routinely require the Court to balance the lock-in risk of saying too much against the transparency cost of saying too little". Chief Justice Roberts later used the phrase in an opinion for the Court in Trump v. Cook (2026), writing that the case "arises on the Court's interim docket". Baude wrote that he thought it was the first time the justices had used that label in an opinion.

== Procedure ==
In the Supreme Court's ordinary proceedings, cases are filed to the merits docket. Cases are accepted if four justices decide to grant certiorari (the so-called rule of four), with the overwhelming majority being denied (around 80 out of 7,000–8,000 petitions for certiorari are granted each term). Accepted cases then feature full briefings (including from amici curiae, if any) and oral arguments, with cases generally lasting months. Finally, the Court issues a lengthy, signed majority opinion, in which the majority extensively explains its reasoning for the ruling.

For the shadow docket, following an application to the relevant circuit justice, they will decide whether to independently make a ruling or refer it to their colleagues. Applications are dealt with on an accelerated time frame, with decisions coming in a week or less. Should a justice proceed alone, the parties in a case may request that other justices overrule them instead. According to the Court, there are four criteria for stays to be granted:

1. that there is a "reasonable probability" that four Justices will grant certiorari, or agree to review the merits of the case;
2. that there is a "fair prospect" that a majority of the Court will conclude upon review that the decision below on the merits was erroneous;
3. that irreparable harm will result from the denial of the stay;
4. finally, in a close case, the Circuit Justice may find it appropriate to balance the equities, by exploring the relative harms to the applicant and respondent, as well as the interests of the public at large.

Shadow docket orders are usually unsigned and unexplained. Court observers may attempt to infer how the justices split based on signed concurrences and dissents, rather than the majority opinion. In the Court's August 2020 – July 2021 term, the exact vote count was known in 14 cases out of the 73 emergency cases referred to the whole court (there were 150 such cases in total). There were 56 merits docket rulings during that period. Inferences for judicial splits are inexact unless there are three public dissents for certiorari denials or four for all other orders.

== Authority to issue stays and injunctions ==
The United States Congress has specifically authorized each justice to issue stays pending certiorari under 28 U.S.C. § 2101(f). Under the Supreme Court's Rules 22 and 23, requests for stay are directed to the assigned circuit justice, who can either grant, deny, or refer the request to the full court.

Before 1990, the rules of the Supreme Court also stated that "a writ of injunction may be granted by any Justice in a case where it might be granted by the Court." However, this part of the rule (and all other specific mention of injunctions) was removed in the Supreme Court's rules revision of December 1989. Nevertheless, requests for an injunction under the All Writs Act are sometimes directed to the circuit justice.

One influential in-chambers opinion denying an injunction, Communist Party of Indiana v. Whitcomb (1972) (Rehnquist, in chambers) noted that

While a Circuit Justice of this Court apparently has authority under Supreme Court Rule 51 (Note: That was the rule titled "Stays", which was moved to Rule 23 effective 1990. However, that revision also dropped all mention of injunctions.) to grant [...] a mandatory injunction, usage and practice suggest that this extraordinary remedy be employed only in the most unusual case. In order that it be available, the applicants' right to relief must be indisputably clear.

Subsequent in-chambers opinions have cited this "indisputably clear" standard, including Lux v. Rodrigues (2010) (Roberts, in chambers) and Hobby Lobby v. Sebelius (2012) (Sotomayor, in chambers).

An order of the full court in Respect Maine PAC v. McKee (2010) denied an injunction, quoting Ohio Citizens for Responsible Energy, Inc. v. NRC (1986) (Scalia, in chambers) that a request for an injunction "demands a significantly higher justification" than a request for a stay, because it "does not simply suspend judicial alteration of the status quo but grants judicial intervention that has been withheld by lower courts."

In Wheaton College v. Burwell (2014), the full court granted an injunction over a dissent authored by Justice Sotomayor, who argued that the "indisputably clear" standard should apply. Chief Justice Roberts, in a lone concurrence in South Bay United Pentecostal Church v. Newsom (2020) ("South Bay I"), also applied the "indisputably clear" standard to deny a request for an injunction even when it was referred to the full court. But in Roman Catholic Diocese of Brooklyn v. Cuomo (2020) and Tandon v. Newsom (2021), a majority of the court granted injunctions under the lower "likelihood of success" standard of the Winter factors, the ordinary test for a preliminary injunction.

== History ==
=== Historical use ===
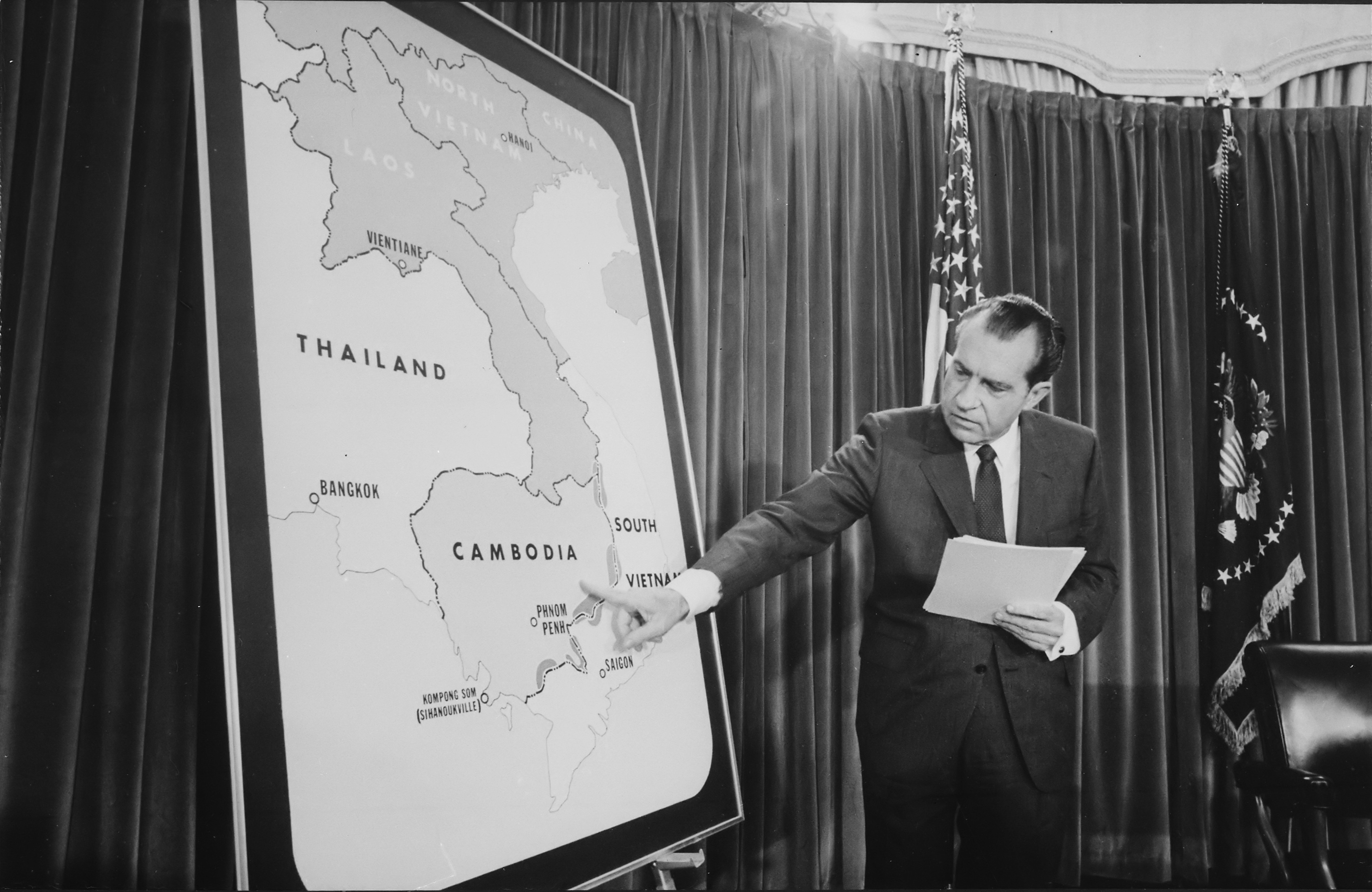
Nixon announcing the U.S. invasion of Cambodia

The shadow docket was used primarily for issuing routine orders, such as giving parties more time to file a brief or extending oral arguments. However, on rare occasions, it was used for consequential rulings such as the 1953 stay of the executions of Julius and Ethel Rosenberg and the reinstatement in Schlesinger v. Holtzman (1973) of an emergency injunction ordering a halt to the Nixon administration's bombing of Cambodia.

A major reason why the Court has used the shadow docket has been to manage its caseload. In Maryland v. Baltimore Radio Show, Inc. (1950), Justice Felix Frankfurter explained for a unanimous court why the shadow docket was necessary, stating: "If the Court is to do its work it would not be feasible to give reasons, however brief, for refusing to take these cases. The time that would be required is prohibitive."

=== February 2016 ===
On February 9, 2016 in West Virginia v. EPA 15A773, the Supreme Court voted 5-4 along partisan lines to use the shadow docket for the first time to make a major decision quickly before the appeals circuit court had ruled on the merits of the EPA's Clean Power Plan. Internal Supreme Court memos obtained by an investigation from The New York Times showed that Roberts initiated the push for the use of the docket. Roberts argued that failing to stay the circuit court's decision in Michigan v. EPA while they considered the case, effectively allowed EPA regulations on mercury emissions to remain in force. By the time the Supreme Court had ruled to overturn the rule due to the financial burden it placed on companies, many companies had already spent money to become compliant with the rule. Roberts considered their lack of a stay made the EPA rule effectively irreversible. In suggesting a stay in West Virginia, Roberts dismissed warnings from his colleagues that the move was unprecedented, writing in a memo "I recognize that the posture of this stay request is not typical." The investigation concluded that that decision "marks the birth, many legal experts believe, of the court's modern 'shadow docket,' the secretive track that the Supreme Court has since used to make many major decisions." Many legal experts agree.

=== Since 2017 ===
Use of the shadow docket for important rulings has increased precipitously since 2017. This coincided with the first presidency of Donald Trump, when the Department of Justice sought emergency relief (generally to stay lower court rulings against its executive actions) from the Supreme Court at a far higher rate than had previous administrations, filing 41 emergency applications over Trump's first four years in office (by comparison, over the prior 16 years the Obama administration and the Bush administration together filed only eight emergency applications).

Rulings made by way of the shadow docket during Trump's term included rulings over his travel ban, the diversion of military funds to the construction of the Mexico–United States border wall, the prohibition of transgender people from openly serving in the United States military, use of the federal death penalty, and restrictions on asylum seekers from Central America. The Supreme Court granted 28 of the Trump administration's requests; in the 16 years prior, only four were granted.

Following the end of Trump's first term, the Court made rulings against the Biden administration, putting an end to a federal eviction moratorium and nullifying the White House's attempt to end the Remain in Mexico policy. The latter was decided in an order two paragraphs long. In September 2021, the shadow docket gained more prominence after the Court declined to block the Texas Heartbeat Act from being enforced and decided some technical matters concerning how it could be challenged in Whole Woman's Health v. Jackson.

In 2021, both the United States House Committee on the Judiciary and the United States Senate Committee on the Judiciary held its first hearings on the practice in February and September respectively.

Coinciding with other attempts to reform the Supreme Court, Senate Democrats introduced legislation in 2024 aiming to require the Court to provide written explanations of its decision and disclose how the Justices voted.

According to a survey conducted by the New York Times of 65 sitting judges, 47 disagreed that the United States Supreme Court had made appropriate use of the shadow docket since the onset of the second Donald Trump administration. Only 12 judges said the shadow docket had been used appropriately.

== Commentary ==
=== Scope of judicial power ===
Critics contend that the shadow docket gives the Supreme Court an unreasonable amount of power. Nicholas Stephanopoulos, a law professor at Harvard University, has argued that the "idea of unexplained, unreasoned court orders seems so contrary to what courts are supposed to be all about ... If courts don't have to defend their decisions, then they're just acts of will, of power. They're not even pretending to be legal decisions."

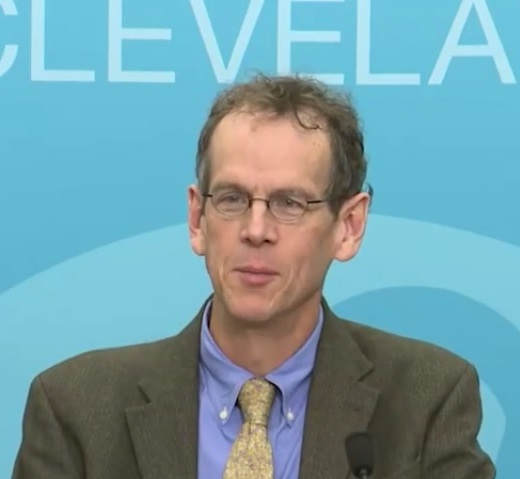
Cole in 2016

David D. Cole, the national legal director of the American Civil Liberties Union and a professor at Georgetown University Law Center, has likewise said that if the Court can "make significant decisions without giving any reasons, then there's really no limit to what they can do". Steve Vladeck, the Charles Alan Wright chair of federal courts at University of Texas School of Law, has lambasted the novel uses of the shadow docket, writing in the New York Times:

Until this term, it would have been unheard-of to articulate a new constitutional rule while issuing an emergency injunction to enforce it ... A majority of the justices are increasingly using procedural tools meant to help them control their docket to make significant substantive changes in the law, in defiance not only of their own standards for such relief, but of fundamental principles of judicial decision making.

Solicitor General of Alabama Edmund LaCour has defended the use of the shadow docket, stating that due to "time-sensitive matters" it would be inappropriate to use the usual channels and its existence was important to keep the Court functioning properly; former U.S. Senate Judiciary chair Chuck Grassley saying that the Court's decision in Whole Woman's Health v. Jackson was "something very ordinary".

=== Transparency ===
The shadow docket has been criticized for a lack of transparency. William Baude has argued that the shadow docket makes it "hard for the public to know what is going on" and "hard for the public to trust that the court is doing its best work". Similarly, House Judiciary courts subcommittee chair Hank Johnson has contended: "Knowing why the Justices selected certain cases, how each of them voted, and their reasoning is indispensable to the public's trust in the court's integrity."

The Economist has argued that the shadow docket displays a "deficit of transparency and accountability", while Steve Vladeck has criticized how decisions are "handed down at all hours of the day ... with little opportunity for public involvement or scrutiny." He has argued: "For a Court whose legitimacy depends largely on the public's perception of its integrity, the growth of unseen, unsigned, and unexplained decisions that disrupt life for millions of Americans can only be a bad thing".

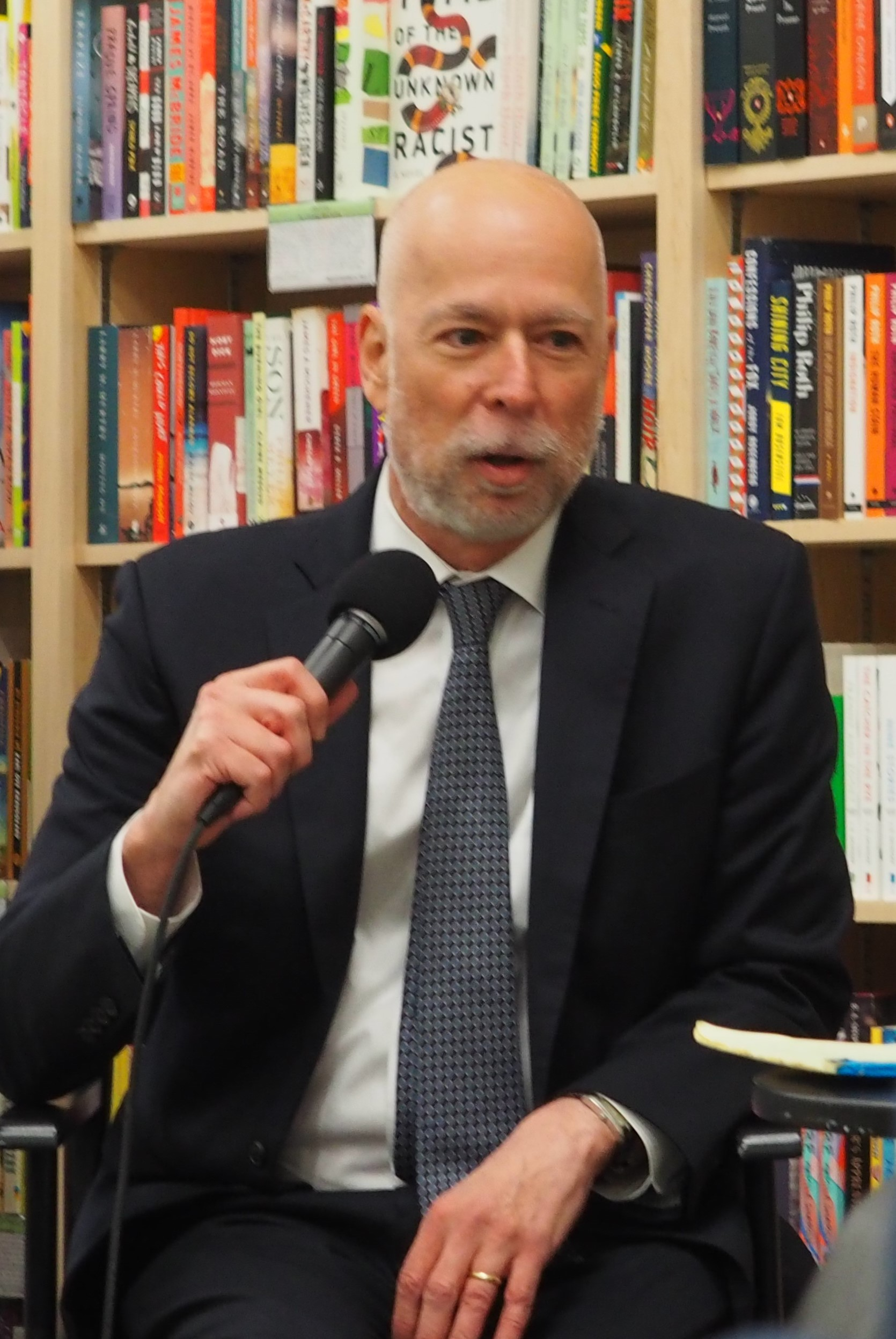
Liptak in 2019

Criticisms of the lack of transparency of the shadow docket preceded the term's coinage in 2015. In 2014, New York Times Supreme Court correspondent Adam Liptak criticized the Court's opinions as "not abstruse. They are absent." This was in response to Chief Justice John Roberts's comments in his 2005 confirmation hearing that he hoped "we haven't gotten to the point where the Supreme Court's opinions are so abstruse that the educated layperson can't pick them up and read them and understand them".

=== Accusations of bias ===
Baude has spoken to a bias present in the rates at which requests are granted, saying that the "government, especially the federal government, has a special ability to get the court's attention." Vladeck further criticized this apparent bias:

With a newly solidified bloc of five conservative Justices, it is not exactly surprising that a Republican administration would generally fare well ... it is not obvious that it is a positive development ... By waiting for most cases to go through multiple layers of review by lower courts ... the Court gives itself the benefit of multiple rounds of briefing and argument ... To abandon this norm only in cases in which the federal government is the complaining party is to invite serious objections grounded in fairness and equity ... such a shift gives at least the appearance that the Court is showing favoritism not only for the federal government as a party, but for a specific political party when it's in control of the federal government.

— "The Solicitor General and the Shadow Docket", Harvard Law Review (2019)

Following the 2026 memo leak, Vladeck wrote about John Roberts' view of who suffers "irreparable harm", "he’s just being a hypocrite. It’s irreparable harm for Republican presidents; just not Democrats".

=== Rigor ===
The shadow docket has also been criticized for its lack of rigor. Vladeck has argued that the shadow docket "put[s] the justices in the position of deciding weighty legal issues at a very early stage of litigation, in a context in which it is often unclear exactly what the relevant facts are and in which legal arguments have not been fully developed."

Similarly, Shoba Sivaprasad Wadhia, a professor and associate dean at Penn State Law, has stated that "it's hard to imagine that [the justices] have the same deliberation or time to think about the varying arguments by each party." Ian Millhiser, a journalist at Vox who covers the Supreme Court, has argued that "if the Supreme Court pushes too many of its decisions onto its shadow docket, the justices in the majority may never figure out that their first instinct regarding how to decide a case was flawed."

Alito defended the rigor behind the decisions made in the shadow docket, highlighting how time constraints limited what could be expressed in the Court's opinions and how the writing had to be done carefully: "Journalists may think that we can just dash off an opinion the way they dash off articles".

=== Increased use ===
Although over the years the justices have sought to assert that it is "a court of final review and not first view", with the maxim being repeated in 11 of the October 2018 term's cases, other criticism has been directed at the significant uptick in the use of the shadow docket.

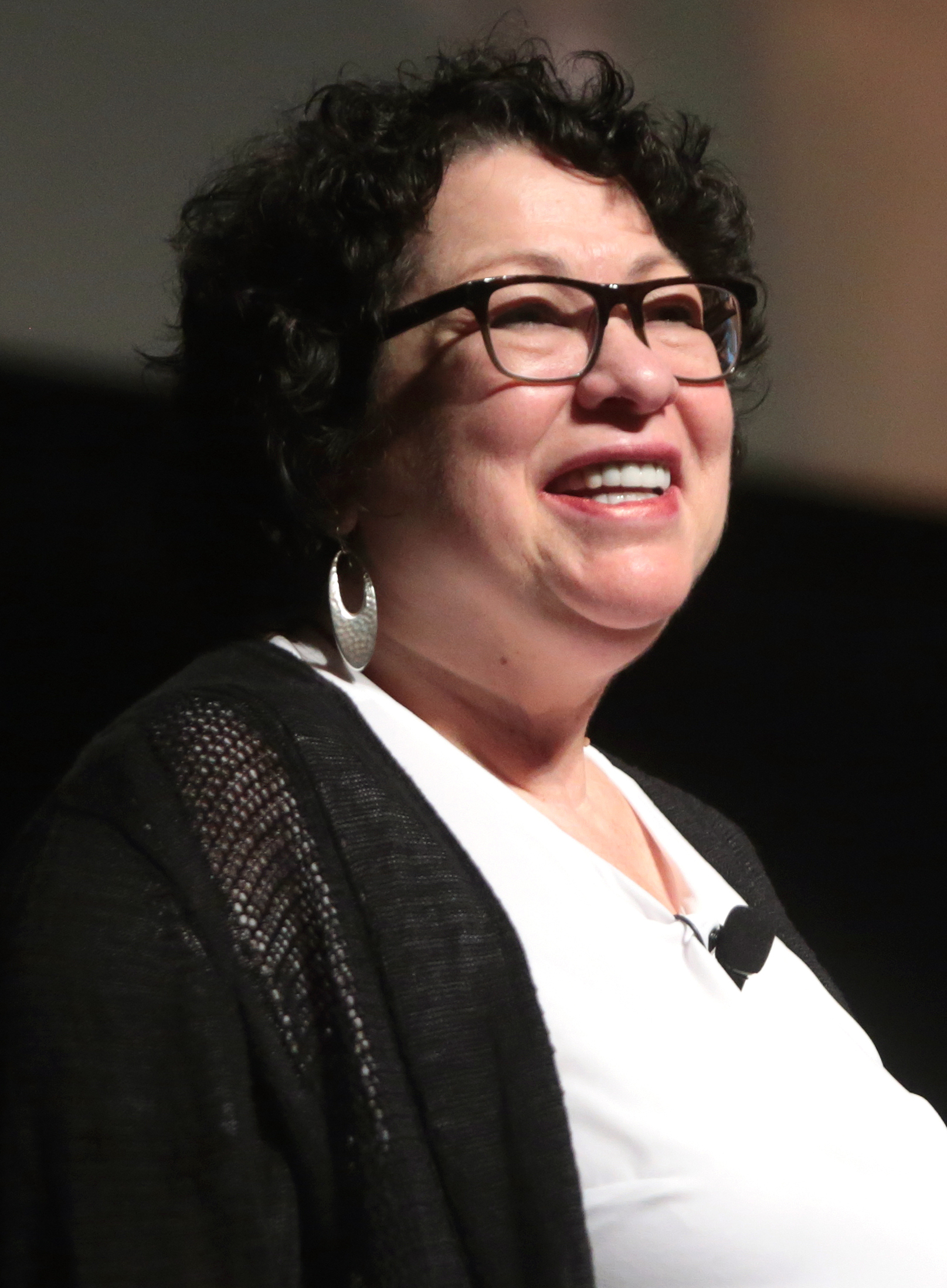
Justice Sotomayor

In September 2019, Justice Sonia Sotomayor criticized the government's over-reliance on the practice in a dissent to an unexplained immigration order, saying that "the Government has treated this exceptional mechanism as a new normal. Historically, the Government has made this kind of request rarely; now it does so reflexively." She went on further, stating that "Not long ago, the Court resisted the shortcut the Government now invites. I regret that my colleagues have not exercised the same restraint here."

David Cole has similarly argued that "relief should be restricted to the most egregious cases truly requiring expedited action, yet it is increasingly being applied to run-of-the-mill disputes."

Justice Samuel Alito has defended the increased use of the shadow docket, saying it was due to increased applications and comparing it to "complaining about the emergency room for treating too many accident victims who come in".

While the Supreme Court has had a 6–3 conservative majority since the appointment of Justice Amy Coney Barrett in October 2020, the shadow docket had seen increased use, and the Court treats these orders as precedential despite the lack of opinions attached to the order. The remaining liberal justices, Stephen Breyer, Sonia Sotomayor, and Elena Kagan, had spoken in various dissents to shadow docket orders on their questionable use. Chief Justice John Roberts also joined in a dissent on the use of shadow dockets in a case involving the Clean Water Act that had been authored by Kagan.

=== Precedential effect ===
As the highest court in the United States, the Supreme Court's rulings have precedential value, being used by the lower courts as guidance for their own rulings. However, by their very nature, shadow docket orders are usually unexplained and are not intended for use as such. Despite that, the use of shadow docket orders as precedent has increased in recent years. In Trump v. Boyle, the Supreme Court wrote, "Although our interim orders are not conclusive as to the merits, they inform how a court should exercise its equitable discretion in like cases."

Writing in the Harvard Journal of Law and Public Policy, Judge Trevor N. McFadden of the federal District of Columbia district court argued that not all shadow docket decisions should be used for precedent: he said that lower courts should only focus on stays issued by the full Court and that this instruction is "true even if the stay grant features little legal reasoning, and may well be true even when there is no reasoning."

For example, with respect to denials of certiorari, Justice Frankfurter wrote:

Inasmuch, therefore, as all that a denial of a petition for a writ of certiorari means is that fewer than four members of the Court thought it should be granted, this Court has rigorously insisted that such a denial carries with it no implication whatever regarding the Court's views on the merits of a case which it has declined to review. The Court has said this again and again; again and again the admonition has to be repeated.

— Maryland v. Baltimore Radio Show, Inc. (1950)

== See also ==
- List of significant shadow docket decisions made by the United States Supreme Court
- Procedures of the Supreme Court of the United States
- History of the Supreme Court of the United States
- In-chambers opinion
