= Discretionary review =

Court's decision on which appeals to hear

Discretionary review is the authority appellate courts have to decide which appeals they will consider from among the cases submitted to them. This offers the judiciary a filter on what types of cases are appealed, because judges have to consider in advance which cases will be accepted. The appeals court will then be able to decide substantive cases with the lowest opportunity cost. The opposite of discretionary review is any review mandated by statute, which guides appellate courts about what they can and cannot do during the review process.

The advantage to discretionary review is that it enables an appellate court to focus its limited resources on developing a coherent body of case law, or at least it is able to focus on making decisions in a consistent fashion (in jurisdictions where case law is not recognized). The disadvantage is that it reduces the ability of litigants to seek review of incorrect decisions of lower courts. However, the problem with allowing appeals of right through all appellate levels is that it encourages parties to exploit every technical error of each level of the court system as a basis for further review. Discretionary review forces parties to always concentrate their resources on persuading the trial court to get it right the first time around (rather than assuming an appellate court will "fix it later"), thus increasing the overall efficiency of the judicial system. Of course, it also leaves them at the mercy of the discretion of the trial court.

== Europe Commission of Human Rights ==
The European Commission of Human Rights exercised discretionary review against the petitions it received under the European Convention on Human Rights by rejecting those that it determined were ill-founded and show no apparent violation, which has allowed it to manage its caseload. By doing so, the Commission has evolved from a "service organisation" to a "commonweal organisation", whose decisions create legal precedent.

== Ireland ==
The 1937 Constitution of Ireland originally provided a right of appeal to the Supreme Court for all cases from the High Court. A 2013 amendment introduced a new Court of Appeal, above the High Court and below the Supreme Court, which is the usual court of final appeal. The Supreme Court now has discretion whether to hear appeals from the Court of Appeal or, exceptionally, directly from the High Court.

== United States ==
For the Supreme Court of the United States, this discretion is termed the granting of a writ of certiorari ("cert"). This discretion was not granted to the Court until 1891, after its docket became clogged with pro forma appeals from lower courts. The Congress then created the United States courts of appeals system divided into now twelve regional circuits, with the Supreme Court generally only hearing cases from the appellate level or from the highest state court. The Judiciary Act of 1925 further expanded certiorari, authorizing the court to determine any case from a lower level concerning "federal questions of substance". Today, 98 percent of federal cases are decided at the appellate level. In 1988, Congress further limited appeals with the Supreme Court Case Selections Act, eliminating the right of appeal from certain state court decisions construing federal law.

A similar model holds in most U.S. state judiciaries, with discretionary review only available to the state's supreme court, and the appeals courts bound to hear all appeals. In North Carolina, the supreme court's choice to exercise discretionary review depends not on whether the case was decided correctly with regard to the defendant's guilt, but on whether the particular legal questions raised in the appeal have a public interest, involve important legal principles, or conflict with precedents set by prior supreme courts. In Texas, discretionary review is granted to both of the state's supreme courts (Texas is one of two states with separate supreme courts for civil and criminal cases) for all but death penalty cases, which the Court of Criminal Appeals is required to review, bypassing the Texas Courts of Appeals.
