= Procedures of the Supreme Court of the United States =

The Supreme Court of the United States is the highest court in the federal judiciary of the United States. The procedures of the Court are governed by the U.S. Constitution, various federal statutes, and its own internal rules. Since 1869, the Court has consisted of one chief justice and eight associate justices. Justices are nominated by the president, and with the advice and consent (confirmation) of the U.S. Senate, appointed to the Court by the president. Once appointed, justices have lifetime tenure unless they resign, retire, or are removed from office.

Established pursuant to Article III, Section 1 of the Constitution in 1789, it has original jurisdiction over a small range of cases, such as suits between two or more states, and those involving ambassadors. It also has ultimate appellate jurisdiction over all federal court and state court cases that involve a point of constitutional or statutory law. Most of the cases the Supreme Court hears are appeals from lower courts. Moreover, the Court has the power of judicial review, the ability to invalidate a statute for violating a provision of the Constitution or an executive act for being unlawful. However, it may act only within the context of a case in an area of law over which it has jurisdiction. The Court may decide cases having political overtones, but does not have power to decide nonjusticiable political questions.

== Terms and sittings ==
A term of the Supreme Court commences on the first Monday of each October, and continues until June or early July of the following year. Each term consists of alternating periods of approximately two weeks known as "sittings" and "recesses." Justices hear cases and deliver rulings during sittings; they discuss cases and write opinions during recesses.

== The Court's authority to hear cases ==
=== Appellate jurisdiction ===
In nearly all of the cases heard by the Supreme Court, the Court exercises the appellate jurisdiction granted to it by Article III of the Constitution. This authority permits the Court to affirm, amend or overturn decisions made by lower courts and tribunals. Procedures for bringing cases before the Supreme Court have changed significantly over time. Today, cases are brought before the Supreme Court by one of several methods, of which the first two account for the overwhelming majority of cases decided:

- By petition for a writ of certiorari, filed by a party to a case that has been decided by one of the United States courts of appeals or by the United States Court of Appeals for the Armed Forces.
- By petition for writ of certiorari with respect to a decision of one of the territorial or state courts, after all state appeals have been exhausted, where an issue of federal constitutional or statutory law is in question. The writ is usually issued to a state supreme court (including high courts of the District of Columbia, Puerto Rico, the U.S. Virgin Islands, Guam, the Northern Mariana Islands, and American Samoa), but is occasionally issued to a state's intermediate appellate court for cases where the state supreme court denied certiorari or review and thereby refused to hear the appeal.
- By petition for certiorari before judgment, which permits the Court to expedite a case pending before a United States court of appeals by accepting the case for review before the appellate court has decided it. However, Supreme Court Rule 11 provides that a case may be taken by the Court before judgment in a lower court "only upon a showing that the case is of such imperative public importance as to justify deviation from normal appellate practice and to require immediate determination in this Court."
- By appeal from certain decisions of United States district courts in certain cases involving redistricting of congressional or state legislative districts, or when specifically authorized in a particular statute.
- By a certified question or proposition of law from one of the United States Courts of Appeals, meaning that the Court of Appeals requests the Supreme Court to instruct it on how to decide the case. This procedure was once common but is now rarely invoked; the last certificate accepted for review was in 1981.
- By petition for an "extraordinary writ" such as mandamus, prohibition, or habeas corpus. These writs are rarely granted by the Supreme Court though they are more frequently granted by lower courts.

=== Original jurisdiction ===
Certain cases that have not been considered by a lower court may be heard by the Supreme Court in the first instance under what is termed original jurisdiction. The Supreme Court's authority in this respect is also derived from Article III of the Constitution, which states that the Supreme Court shall have original jurisdiction "in all cases affecting ambassadors, other public ministers and consuls, and those in which a state shall be party." The original jurisdiction of the Court is set forth in 28 U.S.C. § 1251. This statute provides further that, in the case of disputes between two or more states, the Supreme Court holds both original and exclusive jurisdiction and no lower court may hear such cases, whereas lower federal courts have concurrent jurisdiction in other cases, such as those where only one party is a state, and typically first hear such cases.

The number of original jurisdiction cases heard by the court is small; generally only one or two such cases are heard per term. Because the nine-member Supreme Court is not well-suited to conducting pretrial proceedings or trials, original jurisdiction cases accepted by the Court are typically referred to a well-qualified lawyer or lower-court judge to serve as special master, conduct the proceedings, and report recommendations to the Court. The Court then considers whether to accept the special master's report or whether to sustain any exceptions filed to the report.

Although jury trials are in theory possible in the Court's original jurisdiction cases, there has not been one since Georgia v. Brailsford in 1794. In 1950, in the case United States v. Louisiana, the state of Louisiana moved for a jury trial, but the Court denied the motion, ruling that the suit was an equity action and not an action at law, and that therefore the Seventh Amendment guarantee of a jury trial did not apply. If a matter involving an action at law did come before the court, however, a jury would likely be empaneled and would hear the case alongside the justices of the Court.

== Selection of cases ==
Since the Judiciary Act of 1925 ("The Certiorari Act" in some texts), the majority of the Supreme Court's jurisdiction has been discretionary. Each year, the court receives approximately 9,000–10,000 petitions for certiorari, of which about 1% (approximately 80–100) are granted plenary review with oral arguments, and an additional 50 to 60 are disposed of without plenary review. A request for a writ of certiorari must be submitted within 90 days of the decision of the lower court. An extension of 60 days can be requested from the appropriate circuit justice; the justices vary in their willingness to grant extensions. The Court strictly enforces its requirements for the preparation and timely filing of certiorari petitions, in order to manage such a massive caseload. This occasionally results in harsh consequences, as Justice Thomas acknowledged in a 2007 opinion: "Just a few months ago, the Clerk, pursuant to this Court's Rule 13.2, refused to accept a petition for certiorari submitted by Ryan Heath Dickson because it had been filed one day late ... Dickson was executed on April 26, 2007, without any Member of this Court having even seen his petition for certiorari. The rejected certiorari petition was Dickson's first in this Court, and one can only speculate as to whether denial of that petition would have been a foregone conclusion." Once a request for a writ of certiorari has been filed, the respondents may choose to file a brief in opposition to the request within 30 days (this too can be granted an extension).

In theory, each justice's clerks write a brief for the Justice outlining the questions presented, and offering a recommendation as to whether certiorari should be granted; in practice, most justices (all of the current court, except Justices Alito and Gorsuch) have their clerks participate in the cert pool. Based on the briefs written by the clerk(s) and their recommendations, the chief justice schedules for discussion at a weekly conference of the justices those petitions he believes have sufficient merit to warrant it; the other justices may also add petitions for discussion. Cases not designated for discussion by any Justice are automatically denied review after some time. A justice may also decide that a case be "re-listed" for discussion at a later conference; this occurs, for example, where the Court decides to request input from the Solicitor General of the United States on whether a petition should be granted. The votes of four justices at conference (see Rule of four) will suffice to grant certiorari and place the case on the court's calendar. The grant or denial of certiorari petitions by the Court are usually issued as one-sentence orders without explanation. If the Supreme Court grants certiorari (or the certified question or other extraordinary writ), then a briefing schedule is arranged for the parties to submit their briefs in favor of or against a particular form of relief. Overall, the justices grant certiorari in about 1% of all cases filed (During the 1980s and 1990s, the number of cases accepted and decided each term approached 150 per year; more recently, the number of cases granted has averaged well under 100 annually).

Cases that fall within the Court's original jurisdiction are initiated by filing a complaint directly with the Supreme Court, and normally are assigned to a special master appointed by the Court for the taking of evidence and making recommendations, after which the Court may accept briefs and hear oral arguments as in an appellate case.

== Hearing cases ==
=== Filing briefs ===
Before oral arguments, the parties to a case file legal briefs outlining their arguments. An amicus curiae may also submit a brief in support of a particular outcome in the case if the Court grants it permission. Formal rules govern every aspect of these briefs; Chief Justice William Rehnquist described the rules thus:

The rules direct what information must be included in a brief, describe the size of paper and type of print, and limit the number of pages. Even the colors of the covers of the briefs are specified: the petitioner's brief must have a blue cover and the respondent's must have a red cover. The Court also often receives briefs from amici curiae (friends of the Court) in particular cases, and these must have a green cover. This color-coding comes in very handy when you have a stack of eight or ten briefs in a particular case and can locate the brief you want by its color without having to read the covers of each.

=== Oral arguments ===
Thereafter, if the Court chooses to hold a hearing, each side has thirty minutes to present its case orally. In exceptional and controversial cases, however, the time limit may be extended. In the Court's early years, attorneys might argue a single case for hours or even days; but as the judicial workload increased, the time available for argument has been restricted. The late Chief Justice Rehnquist was noted for his especially strict enforcement of the argument time limits.

To file pleadings or to argue a case, an attorney must be a member of the bar of the Court. (The primary requirement for admission to the Bar is that the attorney must have been admitted to practice in the highest court of a state or territory for at least the past three years.) Justices are allowed to interrupt the attorney speaking in order to ask him or her questions, and particularly since the arrival of Justice Antonin Scalia in 1986, do so often. At the beginning of the 2019 term, the Court adopted a rule allotting advocates two minutes of uninterrupted time for introductory remarks.

Access to oral arguments are generally limited to the justices, the counsels for the parties of the cases, and about 50 seats set aside for members of the public to watch. The Court began recording Oral Arguments in October 1955. Beginning in October 2010, the Supreme Court began the practice of posting recordings and transcripts of the oral arguments made during the preceding week on Fridays on the Court's website.

In an interview for C-SPAN, former Justice Scalia, speaking for himself, noted that by the time the justices hear oral arguments, having read the submissions by the parties and amici, it was "very rare, though not unheard of", for the discussion during the oral arguments to change his view of a case in which he had already made up his mind based on the submissions and his research about the case. However, he also made the point that it was "quite common" for him to go into oral arguments with his mind not made up yet, as the cases are usually very hard and difficult, and that in those situations a persuasive attorney could make the difference for him.

Due to the coronavirus pandemic in early 2020 requiring social distancing to prevent spread of the virus, the Supreme Court cancelled several oral arguments in the months of March and April and, as to prevent excessive backup on their schedule, held oral arguments in about a dozen cases via teleconference in May 2020. All remaining cases accepted in the 2019–20 term were rescheduled for oral arguments in the 2020–21 term. The teleconferences included all nine Justices and the legal counsels for the cases, but in a first for the Court, were live-streamed for all members of the public to listen to live.

== Forming opinions ==
=== The conference: assignment of opinions ===
At the end of a week in which the Court has heard oral arguments, the justices hold a conference to discuss the cases and vote on any new petitions of certiorari. The justices discuss the points of law at issue in the cases. No clerks are permitted to be present, which would make it exceedingly difficult for a justice without a firm grasp of the matters at hand to participate. At this conference, each justice—in order from most to least senior—states the basis on which the justice would decide the case, and a preliminary vote is taken.

Former Justice Scalia professed frustration that there is little substantive discussion, while former Chief Justice Rehnquist wrote that this makes the conference more efficient. The votes are tallied, and the responsibility for writing the opinion in the case is assigned to one of the justices in the majority. The most senior justice voting in the majority (but always the chief justice if in the majority) makes the assignment.

=== Circulating draft opinions and changing of views ===
The justice writing the opinion for the court will produce and circulate a draft opinion to the other justices. Each justice's law clerks may be involved in this phase. In modern Supreme Court history only a few justices, such as former Justice Antonin Scalia, have regularly written their own first drafts. Once the draft opinion has been reviewed, the remaining justices may recommend changes to the opinion. Whether these changes are accommodated depends on the legal philosophy of the drafters as well as on how strong a majority the opinion garnered at conference. A justice may instead simply join the opinion at that point without comment.

Votes at conference are preliminary; while opinions are being circulated, it is not unheard of for a justice to change sides. A justice may be swayed by the persuasiveness (or lack thereof) of the opinion or dissent, or as a result of reflection and discussion on the points of law at issue.

The evolution of the justices' views during the circulation of draft opinions can change the outcome of the case; an opinion that begins as a majority opinion can become a dissenting opinion, and vice versa. At the conference for Planned Parenthood v. Casey, Justice Kennedy is said to have initially voted with Chief Justice Rehnquist, but then changed his mind, feeling unable to join Rehnquist's draft opinion. While working for the Justice Department, present-day Chief Justice John Roberts—a former Rehnquist law clerk—wrote an analysis of Wallace v. Jaffree in which he indicated his belief (based on the length and structure) that Rehnquist's dissent had started out as an opinion for the court, but lost its majority; similar speculation is often heard of Justice O'Connor's dissent in Kelo v. New London. Justice Kennedy is known within the Court for changing his mind subsequent to the conference, and Justice Thomas is known for having the tendency to lose a majority. Justices may change sides at any time prior to the handing down of the Court's opinion. Generally, the Court's decision is the opinion which a majority (five or more) of justices have joined. In rare instances, the Court will issue a plurality opinion in which four or fewer Justices agree on one opinion, but the others are so fractured that they cannot agree on a position. In this circumstance, in order to determine what the decision is lawyers and judges will analyze the opinions to determine on which points a majority agrees. An example of a case decided by a plurality opinion is Hamdi v. Rumsfeld.

A justice voting with the majority may write a concurring opinion; this is an opinion where the justice agrees with the majority holding itself, but where he or she wishes to express views on the legal elements of the case that are not encompassed in the majority opinion. Justices who do not agree with the decision made by the majority may also submit dissenting opinions, which may give alternative legal viewpoints. Dissenting opinions carry no legal weight or precedent, but they can set the argument for future cases. John Marshall Harlan's dissent in Plessy v. Ferguson set down for the majority opinion later in Brown v. Board of Education.

Customarily, justices who were not seated at the time oral arguments were heard by the Supreme Court do not participate in the formulation of an opinion. Likewise, a justice leaving the Court prior to the handing down of an opinion does not take part in the Court's opinion. Should the composition of the Court materially affect the outcome of a pending case, the justices will likely elect to reschedule the case for rehearing.

==== Dismiss as Improvidently Granted (DIG) ====
After granting a writ of certiorari and accepting a case for review, the justices may decide against further review of the case. For example, the Court may feel the case presented during oral arguments did not present the constitutional issues in a clear-cut way, and that adjudication of these issues is better deferred until a suitable case comes before the court. In this event the writ of certiorari is "dismissed as improvidently granted" (DIGged)—saying, in effect that the Court should not have accepted the case. As with the granting or denial of cert, this dismissal is usually issued without explanation, normally with a one-sentence per curiam decision if the Court already heard oral arguments.

==== Tied votes and lack of quorum ====
If not all of the nine justices vote on a case, or the Court has a vacancy, then a tied vote is possible. If this occurs, then the decision of the court below is affirmed, but the case is not considered to be binding precedent. The effect is a return to the status quo ante. No opinions (or voting alignments) are issued in such a case, only the one-sentence announcement that "[t]he judgment is affirmed by an equally divided Court." Omega S.A. v. Costco Wholesale Corp. is an example of such a case.

The court tries to avoid tied votes when possible. When a new justice is appointed, ordinarily only the other eight justices will decide any case that has already had oral arguments. But when the participating justices are evenly split, the case may be reargued with the new justice. For example, after the retirement of Justice O'Connor in 2006, there were three cases that would have had 4–4 splits, but they were all reargued to allow the newly appointed Samuel Alito to cast a decisive vote.

A quorum of justices to hear and decide a case is six. If, through recusals or vacancies, fewer than six justices can participate in a case, and a majority of qualified justices determines that the case cannot be heard in the next term, then the decision of the court below is affirmed as if the Court had been equally divided on the case. An exception exists when this situation arises in one of the now-rare cases brought directly to the Supreme Court on appeal from a United States District Court; in this situation, the case is referred to the U.S. Court of Appeals for the corresponding circuit for a final decision there by either the Court of Appeals sitting en banc, or a panel consisting of the three most senior active circuit judges.

=== Announcement of opinions ===
Throughout the term, but mostly during the last months of the term—May, June, and, if necessary, July—the Court announces its opinions. The decision of the Court is subsequently published, first as a slip opinion, and subsequently in the United States Reports. In recent years, opinions have been available on the Supreme Court's website and other legal websites on the morning they are announced. Since recording devices are banned inside the courtroom, the fastest way for decisions of landmark cases to reach the press had recently been through the Running of the Interns, though this has declined as the Court has started to post opinions online as soon as they are announced from the bench.

The opinion of the Court is usually signed by the author; occasionally, the Supreme Court may issue an unsigned opinion per curiam. The practice of issuing a single opinion of the Court was initiated during the tenure of Chief Justice John Marshall during the early 19th century. This custom replaced the previous practice under which each Justice, whether in the majority or the minority, issued a separate opinion. The older practice is still followed by appellate courts in many common law jurisdictions outside the United States.

== Reporting and citation of cases ==
Supreme Court decisions are typically cited as in the following example: "Roe v. Wade, 410 U.S. 113 (1973)." The court citation consists of the names of the opposing parties; the volume number; "U.S." (signifying United States Reports, the official reporter of Supreme Court decisions); the page number on which the decision begins; and the year in which the case was decided. The names of the opposing parties are listed in the format "Petitioner v. Respondent" or "Appellant v. Appellee." The Reporter of Decisions is responsible for publication of the Court's rulings. Two other widely used citation formats exist: the Supreme Court Reporter and the Lawyers' Edition, corresponding to two privately published collections of decisions. Citations to cases in the Supreme Court Reporter would be structured as follows: Snowden v. Hughes, 64 S. Ct. 397 (1944). Citations to cases in the Lawyers' Edition would be as follows: Snowden v. Hughes, 88 L. Ed. 497 (1944). Judicial opinions often use the citation from all three sources (the United States Reports, Supreme Court Reporter, and Lawyers' Edition), as seen here: Martin v. Texas, 200 U.S. 316, 26 S. Ct. 338, 50 L. Ed. 497 (1906). Since the 1930s, prior to publication of the decisions in these reporters, they are available from the United States Law Week (U.S.L.W.). In more recent years, opinions have been available electronically soon after they appeared on commercial sites such as Lexis or Westlaw, on Internet sites such as FindLaw and on the Court's own website.

The Reporter of Decisions is the court official responsible for the publication of the Court's opinions and orders. The post is currently held by Rebecca Anne Womeldorf since her appointment in December 2020.

Decisions of the Supreme Court are precedents that bind all lower courts, both federal and state. The Supreme Court generally respects its own precedents, but has in some cases overturned them.

== See also ==
- Nomination and confirmation to the Supreme Court of the United States
- History of the Supreme Court of the United States
- Supreme Court Case Selections Act
- United States Supreme Court Building
- Shadow docket
