= Death of Ellen Greenberg =

2011 stabbing death in Philadelphia

Ellen Greenberg
- Born: Ellen Rae Greenberg; June 23, 1983; New York City, New York
- Died: January 26, 2011 (aged 27); Manayunk, Philadelphia, Pennsylvania
- Cause of death: 20 Stab wounds
- Education: Penn State University (B.A.); Temple University; Chestnut Hill College
- Occupation: Teacher
- Known for: Dispute as to whether her death was the result of a homicide or suicide

Ellen Rae Greenberg (June 23, 1983 – January 26, 2011) was an American woman who died after sustaining 20 stab wounds. Her death was officially ruled a suicide. Her family and several medical experts disputed this conclusion, and thought homicide was more likely. The circumstances surrounding the manner of death have prompted significant political activity, legal action, and global media coverage.

Greenberg's family filed a civil lawsuit against the city of Philadelphia, claiming intentional infliction of emotional distress. The case was settled in February 2025 during early stages of the trial, with a $650,000 payment to the family and an agreement to conduct an expeditious medical re-examination of Greenberg's manner of death. In October 2025, Philadelphia's top pathologist issued a report reaffirming the original ruling that Greenberg's manner of death was suicide.

In December 2025, the U.S. Attorney's Office for the Eastern District of Pennsylvania opened a federal investigation into Greenberg's death, probing potential criminal corruption and civil rights violations regarding whether Philadelphia municipal agencies properly handled or actively covered up the 2011 death investigation. In January 2026, federal grand jury subpoenas were issued to the Philadelphia Police Department and other local agencies involved in the case, and the investigation expanded in the spring of 2026 to include interviews by Federal Bureau of Investigation (FBI) agents and federal prosecutors of witnesses and key individuals associated with the forensic reviews.

== Background ==
Ellen Rae Greenberg was born on June 23, 1983, in New York City to Josh and Sandee (née Rubin) Greenberg, and was an only child. The family moved to Harrisburg, Pennsylvania, when she was 11 years old, and she later attended Susquehanna Township High School in Harrisburg, graduating in 2001. She earned a bachelor's degree in communications from Penn State University in 2005, and subsequently her teaching credentials from Temple University and Chestnut Hill College in Philadelphia, earning a master's degree.

At the time of her death, she was a first-grade teacher at Juniata Park Academy in the Juniata neighborhood of Philadelphia, and had taught at the school for four years. She lived in the Manayunk neighborhood of Philadelphia, where she shared an apartment at the Venice Lofts apartment complex with her fiancé, Samuel Goldberg.

She had met her fiancé, Samuel Goldberg, on a blind date. He was an associate director and television producer for NBC Sports at the time. He had proposed to her in June 2010, approximately three years into their relationship. Their wedding was planned for August 13, 2011, and she had mailed out "Save the Date" cards to guests four days before her death.

== Incident ==
On January 26, 2011, a blizzard hit Philadelphia, prompting Greenberg to leave work and return to her apartment. She arrived back at her Manayunk apartment at approximately 1:30 p.m.

According to the investigation report, her fiancé, Samuel Goldberg, returned from a gym in their building to find their apartment door secured from the inside with a swing-bar latch. After unsuccessfully trying to reach Greenberg, Goldberg broke through the locked latch mechanism to gain entry into their apartment. Upon entering, he discovered Greenberg's dead body on the kitchen floor, with a 10-inch (25 cm) knife embedded in her chest. Goldberg called 911 at 6:33 p.m., stating to the dispatcher that Greenberg had "stabbed herself" and "fell on a knife".

At approximately 6:40 p.m., Greenberg was pronounced dead. Her death was the result of 20 stab wounds. They included 10 stab wounds to the back of her head/right neck (ranging from nicks to two that were about three inches (7.6 cm) deep; among them a 2.5-inch-long (6.4 cm) gash on her scalp), and 8 to her central front torso (ranging from .2 centimeters to the 4-inch (10 cm) wound of the 10-inch (25 cm) knife embedded in her chest, and including a 2-inch (5.1 cm) wound to her stomach). A subsequent 2025 report by the Philadelphia Medical Examiner's Office said that many of the stab wounds "would best be categorized as hesitation wounds. No defensive injuries were identified on her body."

Greenberg also had 11 bruises in various stages of resolution, including a large dark bruise on her upper right arm just below her shoulder, three bruises on her right forearm including a vivid round one near her wrist, one bruise on her abdomen, three bruises above her right knee, and three bruises on her right thigh, a city medical examiner noted. The 2025 report noted 20 more bruises, as well as three more stab wounds that were superficial.

== Initial investigations ==
=== Police and Medical Examiner investigations ===
Greenberg was officially pronounced dead at 6:40 p.m. by responding emergency personnel. The apartment crime scene was initially treated as a suicide by police investigators. However, on January 27, following an autopsy, the Philadelphia Medical Examiner's Office initially ruled the manner of death as a homicide. The next day, the Philadelphia Police Department disputed that conclusion, publicly stating: "the death of Ellen Greenberg has not been ruled a homicide ... Homicide investigators are considering the manner of death as suspicious at this time." Following subsequent discussions with law enforcement, the medical examiner's office reversed its conclusion, saying two weeks later that the death was a suicide.

The apartment was professionally cleaned and sanitized on January 27, after police gave permission to do so. James Schwartzman, Samuel Goldberg's uncle, who was an attorney and the Chairman of the Pennsylvania Judicial Conduct Board, also entered the apartment that day to retrieve work and personal laptops, cell phones, and credit cards belonging to both Goldberg and Greenberg. Police investigators returned to the scene on January 28 after securing a search warrant, at which point they requested and retrieved the electronic items taken by Schwartzman.

=== Attorney General investigation ===
In April 2018, the office of Pennsylvania Attorney General Josh Shapiro assumed control of the case due to a conflict of interest within the Philadelphia District Attorney's Office. In May 2019, a spokesperson for the Attorney General's office stated that internet searches recovered from Ellen's personal computer pointed toward Greenberg's death being a suicide, and that the state's independent investigation had been closed.

Legal representation for the Greenberg family disputed the validity of the computer evidence, stating that it was undisputed that Samuel Goldberg's uncle, James Schwartzman, had taken possession of Ellen's iPhone and two computers, thus breaking the chain of custody, before he handed them over to police. The Philadelphia Police Department had also previously submitted Ellen Greenberg's electronic devices to the Philadelphia Regional Computer Forensics Laboratory (RCFL) for a forensic examination, and an internal police document later summarized the findings: "Keyword Searches were done on every computer searching for Suicide Information and the examination did not reveal anything remarkable."

During the year in which the Pennsylvania Attorney General's Office maintained jurisdiction over the case, the Greenberg family's legal team submitted to it a substantial volume of data exceeding 10 gigabytes of newly developed evidence. The submission included forensic files and medical evaluations, digital three-dimensional anatomical reconstructions detailing and analyzing each of the 20 stab wounds inflicted upon her body. It also included extensive deposition transcripts of three officials from the Philadelphia Medical Examiner's Office, one of whom testified that Ellen was likely already dead before a final stab wound was delivered.

=== Case deemed inactive ===
In August 2022, the Attorney General's Office sent the investigation to the Chester County, Pennsylvania District Attorney's Office to avoid the "appearance of a conflict of interest," leading to a review of previous findings, new interviews, and an independent expert consultation. In November 2024, the Chester County District Attorney's Office concluded that the available evidence did not meet the burden of proof for criminal charges, resulting in the case being deemed inactive.

Attorneys for Greenberg's parents criticized the outcome of the investigation, alleged a failure to address evidence that suggested homicide, questioned the qualifications of the expert consulted, and disputed the investigation's conclusions.

== Private investigations ==
On March 15, 2019, The Philadelphia Inquirer published a front-page investigative report reviewing the what was described as suspicious circumstances surrounding Greenberg's death. Pittsburgh forensic pathologist Cyril H. Wecht determined the case was "strongly suspicious of homicide", and said publicly how he did not "know how they wrote this off as a suicide".

Similarly, forensic scientist Henry Lee reviewed the case files and concluded: "the number and types of wounds and bloodstain patterns observed are consistent with a homicide scene".

One significant point of contention in the investigation involved the physical impact of the stab wounds that allegedly penetrated Greenberg's brain and spinal cord. Wayne K. Ross, a forensic pathologist and neuropathologist investigator hired by the Greenberg family, concluded that a specific wound penetrated the cranial cavity and severed cranial nerves, and wrote that the wounds to the brain and spinal cord would have induced immediate traumatic brain injury signs, severe pain, and cranial nerve dysfunction.

The original medical examiner's report stated how a consulting neuropathologist, Dr. Lucy Balian Rorke-Adams, had examined the tissue specimen and concluded there was no such defect or injury to the spinal cord. However, when questioned about the case seven years later by investigators and reporters from The Philadelphia Inquirer, Rorke-Adams responded in writing: "I have no recollection of such a case," and "I would conclude that I did not see the specimen in question although there is a remote possibility that it was shown to me." Journalists for the newspaper examined the official state and medical files and determined that "there was no bill, invoice, or report from Rorke-Adams for this case."

Initially, investigators reported the apartment door was locked from the inside with a swing bar latch, and Goldberg had been with a security guard when he broke it open. However, the manager of Greenberg's apartment complex later said that the engagement of the swing bar latch did not prove that the door had been locked from the inside, because such latches can sometimes be thrown or slide shut if the door is closed forcefully.

The security guard named in the initial police report denied he was present when Goldberg was said to have forced open the door. Building security surveillance footage apparently corroborated the guard's statement, showing Goldberg riding on the elevator alone shortly before Goldberg made the 911 call.

An analysis of cellular phone records by CNN contradicted sworn statements by two of Goldberg's relatives, who had stated they were on the phone with him and listening as he kicked down the apartment door.

== Civil lawsuit ==
In October 2019, Greenberg's parents filed a civil lawsuit against the Philadelphia Medical Examiner's Office and Dr. Marlon Osbourne, the pathologist who conducted the initial autopsy, in the Philadelphia Court of Common Pleas. The lawsuit, a mandamus and declaratory judgment action, sought to compel the city to amend the official manner of death on their daughter's death certificate from "suicide" to either "homicide" or "undetermined."

Under oath during a deposition for the lawsuit, Dr. Osbourne acknowledged that local police investigations heavily influenced his final decision to change the manner of death certificate, despite his initial homicide findings.

In addition, in support of their legal filings, the family's legal team introduced advanced photogrammetry technology that had not been available at the time of Greenberg's death. The photogrammetry digitized the autopsy data to build a three-dimensional anatomical recreation of her body and wounds, tracking the exact measurements, depths, and angles of entry for all 20 strikes. The resulting expert analysis concluded that the location and severe depth of multiple of her neck and back wounds made it biomechanically impossible for them to have been self-inflicted.

In January 2020, the Philadelphia Court of Common Pleas allowed the civil lawsuit filed by Greenberg's parents to proceed past the motion to dismiss stage. The case was scheduled for trial to begin in 2021.

In February 2022, the Pennsylvania Attorney General's office reaffirmed its conclusion that Greenberg's death was a suicide, a determination that Greenberg's parents condemned publicly.

In August 2022, the Pennsylvania Attorney General's Office relinquished control of the matter to avoid the appearance of a conflict of interest given that Philadelphia District Attorney Larry Krasner had previously represented the Greenberg family in private practice, transferring the investigation to the Chester County District Attorney's office which announced it would reopen the investigation into Greenberg's death.

On July 30, 2024, the Supreme Court of Pennsylvania, Eastern District granted a petition for allowance of appeal to review the ongoing lower court challenges regarding the legal authority to dispute the medical examiner's cause of death classification.

=== Intentional infliction of emotional distress case ===
In June 2022, Greenberg's parents filed a civil lawsuit against several Philadelphia city officials and medical examiners, alleging that the 2011 investigation of their daughter's death was "deeply botched" and resulted in a subsequent cover-up that intentionally inflicted emotional distress on the family.

During a summary judgment hearing in December 2024, Philadelphia Court of Common Pleas Judge Michael Erdos openly questioned the original investigation's validity, stating that nobody disagreed that the crime scene should have been handled differently, and noting that the fact the death certificate still listed the cause of death as suicide was "puzzling.

While Judge Erdos dismissed the claims against two defendants, a retired homicide Sergeant and a former assistant medical examiner, he ruled that the Greenbergs had a "fighting chance" to proceed. In January 2025, Judge Erdos officially denied the city's remaining defense motions, clearing the civil lawsuit for a full jury trial against former Medical Examiners Samuel Gulino and Marlon Osbourne, as well as Police Detective John McNamee

In February 2025, just as jury selection was beginning for the civil lawsuit by Greenberg's parents alleging intentional infliction of emotional distress, a settlement was reached between Greenberg's parents and the city, and the settlement agreement was accepted by Judge Erdos. Under the settlement agreement, the city made a $650,000 monetary payout to the family, and agreed to execute an expeditious medical re-examination of Greenberg's manner of death. Coinciding with the city's settlement with the Greenberg family, the original autopsy pathologist, Dr. Marlon Osbourne, filed a sworn legal verification statement officially recanting his previous findings, and asserting that, upon reviewing updated evidence, he no longer agreed with the suicide classification and wrote that "it is my professional opinion Ellen's manner of death should be designated as something other than suicide." Because Osbourne was no longer employed by the Philadelphia Medical Examiner's office, his statement did not have any impact on the official death certificate.

=== Case closed ===
On October 10, 2025, Philadelphia's top pathologist, Chief Medical Examiner Lindsay Simon, issued a 32-page independent review report, officially reaffirming the original ruling that Greenberg's manner of death was suicide. While Simon accepted that "the distribution of injuries is admittedly unusual," he maintained that Greenberg "would be capable of inflicting these injuries herself" given the absence of defensive wounds or signs of a physical struggle at the scene. Based on a technical analysis of photographs taken at the initial 2011 autopsy, Simon also contended that that the physical defect identified in Greenberg's spinal cord was not necessarily caused by a knife, but could have instead been accidentally created by a medical probe during the post-mortem examination procedure. Simon further observed that even if Greenberg had sustained such a severe injury to her spine antemortem, it would neither have neurologically incapacitated Greenberg immediately, nor have prevented her from continuing to move and deliver the remaining stab wounds.

Following the release of the report, the evidentiary civil case hearing was closed.

== Federal investigation ==
In December 2025, the U.S. Attorney's Office for the Eastern District of Pennsylvania opened a federal investigation into Greenberg's death, probing potential criminal corruption and civil rights violations regarding whether Philadelphia municipal agencies properly handled or actively covered up the 2011 death investigation. In January 2026, federal grand jury subpoenas were issued to the Philadelphia Police Department and other local agencies involved in the case for records concerning the initial death investigation and the subsequent reclassification of the death from homicide to suicide. The investigation expanded in the spring of 2026 to include interviews by Federal Bureau of Investigation (FBI) agents and federal prosecutors of witnesses and key individuals associated with the forensic reviews.

== Media coverage ==
Following The Philadelphia Inquirer investigation, the case became a sensation in the true crime community. The incident was featured in the Dr. Oz Show, People Magazine, 48 Hours, Inside Edition, The Philadelphia Inquirer, CBS Philadelphia, Good Day Philadelphia (FOX29 Philly), ABC Harrisburg, CBS Harrisburg, Penn Live, NBC's Oxygen network, the Daily Mail, and Law.com. The suspicion surrounding Greenberg's death was also the subject of a March 2019 episode of the true crime television series Accident, Suicide or Murder. Nancy Grace covered the mysterious circumstances surrounding Ellen's death in her book What Happened to Ellen? An American Miscarriage of Justice.

A documentary series revolving around the case Death in Apartment 603: What Happened to Ellen Greenberg? for ABC News Studios and Hulu premiered on September 29, 2025, directed by Nancy Schwartzman, and executive produced by Elle Fanning and Dakota Fanning. The series mentions that a number of podcasts had covered the story once the 2019 article was published in The Philadelphia Inquirer.

== See also ==
- Jonathan Luna
