= In-chambers opinion =

Opinion by a single justice or judge of a multi-member appellate court

An in-chambers opinion is an opinion by a single justice or judge of a multi-member appellate court, rendered on an issue that the court's rules or procedures allow a single member of the court to decide. The judge is said to decide the matter "in chambers" because the decision can be issued from the judge's chambers without a formal court proceeding.

== Supreme Court of the United States ==
Each Justice of the Supreme Court of the United States is assigned as the "Circuit Justice" to one or more of the 13 judicial circuits. The role of the Circuit Justice has changed over time, but has included addressing certain types of applications arising within the Circuit.

Under current practice, the Circuit Justice for each circuit is responsible for dealing with certain types of applications that, under the Court's rules, may be addressed by a single Justice. These include emergency applications for stays (including requests for stays of execution in death-penalty cases) and injunctions pursuant to the All Writs Act arising from cases within that circuit, as well as more routine matters such as requests for extensions of time. In the past, Circuit Justices also sometimes ruled on motions for bail in criminal cases, writs of habeas corpus, and applications for writs of error granting permission to appeal.

Most often, a Justice will dispose of such an application by simply noting that it is "Granted" or "Denied," or by entering a standard form of order unaccompanied by a written opinion. However, a Justice may elect to author an opinion explaining his or her reasons for granting or denying relief. Such an opinion is referred to as an "in-chambers opinion" or an "opinion in chambers." On occasion, Justices have also issued single-Justice in-chambers opinions on other matters, such as explaining why they have chosen not to recuse themselves from participating in a particular case before the Court.

The Justices author and publish fewer in-chambers opinions today than they did during the twentieth century; it has been rare in recent years for there to be more than one or two such opinions published per term.

Since 1969, in-chambers opinions that a Justice wishes to have published have appeared in the Court's official reporter, the United States Reports. They appear in a separate section at the back of each volume that contains one or more such opinions. Before 1969, in-chambers opinions did not appear in the U.S. Reports, although they were occasionally published in other reporters or in legal periodicals. During the 1990s, the Supreme Court Clerk's Office compiled a collection of in-chambers opinions contained in the Court's records and other sources. The collection was subsequently published in a three-volume edition by the Green Bag Press, and is supplemented from time to time.

=== List of in-chambers opinions since 1990 ===
Case	Opinion citation (Note: The opinions may be accessed from the Supreme Court's website by selecting the appropriate volume (the first number) then scrolling to the appropriate starting page (the second number). For example, 573 U.S. 1301 refers to Volume 573, page 1301 of the United States Reports.)	Justice	Request	Action	Date	Alternate citation (Note: These are citations to Rapp's Reports, the collection of in-chambers opinions compiled by The Green Bag.)
Navarro v. United States	601 U.S. ___	Roberts	Release pending appeal	Denied	March 18, 2024	
Teva Pharmaceuticals USA, Inc. v. Sandoz, Inc.	573 U.S. 1301	Roberts	Recall and stay mandate	Denied	April 18, 2014	5 Rapp no. 16
Hobby Lobby Stores, Inc. v. Sebelius	568 U.S. 1401	Sotomayor	Injunction	Denied	December 26, 2012	5 Rapp no. 15
Maryland v. King	567 U.S. 1301	Roberts	Stay	Granted	July 30, 2012	5 Rapp no. 14
Gray v. Kelly	564 U.S. 1301	Roberts	Stay (capital)	Denied	August 21, 2011	5 Rapp no. 13
Lux v. Rodrigues	561 U.S. 1306	Roberts	Injunction	Denied	September 30, 2010	4 Rapp 1626
Philip Morris USA Inc. v. Scott	561 U.S. 1301	Scalia	Stay	Granted	September 24, 2010	4 Rapp 1622
Jackson v. D.C. Board of Elections and Ethics	559 U.S. 1301	Roberts	Stay	Denied	March 2, 2010	4 Rapp 1620
O'Brien v. O'Laughlin	557 U.S. 1301	Breyer	Stay	Denied	August 26, 2009	4 Rapp 1591
Conkright v. Frommert	556 U.S. 1401	Ginsburg	Stay	Denied	April 30, 2009	4 Rapp 1589
Boumediene v. Bush; Odah v. United States	550 U.S. 1301	Roberts	Extension of time and suspension of order denying certiorari	Denied	April 26, 2007	4 Rapp 1563
Stroup v. Willcox	549 U.S. 1501	Roberts	Stay	Denied	December 18, 2006	4 Rapp 1562
San Diegans for the Mt. Soledad National War Memorial v. Paulson; City of San Diego v. Paulson	548 U.S. 1301	Kennedy	Stays	Granted; Denied	July 7, 2006	4 Rapp 1539
Doe v. Gonzales	546 U.S. 1301	Ginsburg	Vacate stay	Denied	October 7, 2005	4 Rapp 1533
Multimedia Holdings Corp. v. Circuit Court of Florida	544 U.S. 1301	Kennedy	Stay	Denied	April 15, 2005	4 Rapp 1499
Democratic National Committee v. Republican National Committee (2004)	543 U.S. 1304	Souter	Vacate stay	Denied	November 2, 2004	4 Rapp 1498
Spencer v. Pugh	543 U.S. 1301	Stevens	Vacate stays	Denied	November 2, 2004	4 Rapp 1496
Wisconsin Right to Life, Inc. v. FEC	542 U.S. 1306	Rehnquist	Injunction	Denied	September 14, 2004	4 Rapp 1458
Associated Press v. Colorado District Court	542 U.S. 1301	Breyer	Stay	Denied	July 26, 2004	4 Rapp 1455
Cheney v. United States District Court	541 U.S. 913	Scalia	Recuse	Denied	March 18, 2004	4 Rapp 1441
Prato v. Vallas	539 U.S. 1301	Stevens	Extension of time	Denied	June 9, 2003	4 Rapp 1440
Kenyeres v. Ashcroft	538 U.S. 1301	Kennedy	Stay	Denied	March 21, 2003	4 Rapp 1435
Chabad of Southern Ohio v. City of Cincinnati	537 U.S. 1501	Stevens	Vacate stay	Granted	November 29, 2002	4 Rapp 1434
Bartlett v. Stephenson	535 U.S. 1301	Rehnquist	Stay	Denied	May 17, 2002	4 Rapp 1431
Bagley v. Byrd	534 U.S. 1301	Stevens	Stay (capital)	Denied	November 6, 2001	4 Rapp 1429
Brown v. Gilmore	533 U.S. 1301	Rehnquist	Injunction	Denied	September 12, 2001	4 Rapp 1426
Microsoft Corp. v. United States; New York ex. rel. Spitzer v. Microsoft Corp.	530 U.S. 1301	Rehnquist	Recuse (Note: Rehnquist raised sua sponte the question of whether he should recuse.)	Denied	September 26, 2000	4 Rapp 1424
Murdaugh v. Livingston	525 U.S. 1301	Rehnquist	Vacate stay	Denied	November 18, 1998	3 Rapp 1391
Rubin v. United States (1998)	524 U.S. 1301	Rehnquist	Stay	Denied	July 17, 1998	3 Rapp 1389
Netherland v. Gray	519 U.S. 1301	Rehnquist	Vacate stay (capital)	Denied	December 23, 1996	3 Rapp 1387
Netherland v. Tuggle	517 U.S. 1301	Rehnquist	Vacate stay (capital)	Denied	May 15, 1996	3 Rapp 1386
FCC v. Radiofone, Inc.	516 U.S. 1301	Stevens	Vacate stay	Granted	October 25, 1995	3 Rapp 1385
McGraw-Hill v. Procter & Gamble	515 U.S. 1309	Stevens	Stay	Denied	September 21, 1995	3 Rapp 1382
Rodriguez v. Texas	515 U.S. 1307	Scalia	Stay (capital)	Denied	August 31, 1995	3 Rapp 1381
Penry v. Texas	515 U.S. 1304	Scalia	Extension of time (capital)	Denied	August 28, 1995	3 Rapp 1377
Foster v. Gilliam	515 U.S. 1301	Rehnquist	Stay	Granted in part	August 17, 1995	3 Rapp 1374
O'Connell v. Kirchner	513 U.S. 1303	Stevens	Stays	Denied	January 28, 1996	3 Rapp 1372
In re Dow Jones and Company, Inc.	513 U.S. 1301	Rehnquist	Stay	Denied	December 5, 1994	3 Rapp 1370
Edwards v. Hope Medical Group for Women	512 U.S. 1301	Scalia	Stay	Denied	August 17, 1994	3 Rapp 1367
Packwood v. Senate Select Committee on Ethics	510 U.S. 1319	Rehnquist	Stay	Denied	March 2, 1994	3 Rapp 1364
CBS Inc. v. Davis	510 U.S. 1315	Blackmun	Stay	Granted	February 9, 1994	3 Rapp 1360
Planned Parenthood v. Casey	510 U.S. 1309	Souter	Stay	Denied	February 7, 1994	3 Rapp 1354
Capital Square Review and Advisory Board v. Pinette	510 U.S. 1307	Stevens	Stay	Denied	December 23, 1993	3 Rapp 1352
INS v. Legalization Assistance Project	510 U.S. 1301	O'Connor	Stay	Granted	November 26, 1993	3 Rapp 1346
DeBoer v. DeBoer	509 U.S. 1301	Stevens	Stay	Denied	July 26, 1993	3 Rapp 1343
Blodgett v. Campbell	508 U.S. 1301	O'Connor	Vacate order (capital)	Dismissed	May 14, 1993	3 Rapp 1338
Turner Broadcasting System, Inc. v. FCC	507 U.S. 1301	Rehnquist	Injunction	Denied	April 29, 1993	3 Rapp 1335
Grubbs v. Delo	506 U.S. 1301	Blackmun	Stay (capital)	Granted	October 20, 1992	3 Rapp 1334
Reynolds v. IAAF	505 U.S. 1301	Stevens	Stay	Granted	June 20, 1992	3 Rapp 1332
Campos v. City of Houston	502 U.S. 1301	Scalia	Injunction and stay	Denied	October 29, 1991	3 Rapp 1330
Barnes v. E-Systems, Inc. Group Plan	501 U.S. 1301	Scalia	Stay	Granted	August 2, 1991	3 Rapp 1325
Cole v. Texas	499 U.S. 1301	Scalia	Stay (capital)	Granted	March 18, 1991	3 Rapp 1324
Mississippi v. Turner	498 U.S. 1306	Scalia	Extension of time (capital)	Denied	March 2, 1991	3 Rapp 1323
Madden v. Texas	498 U.S. 1301	Scalia	Extension of time (capital)	Granted	February 20, 1991	3 Rapp 1317

== Other American appellate courts ==
The rules of some other multi-member American appellate courts sometimes authorize a single judge or justice to take certain actions. Sometimes these actions are procedural in nature, such as granting extensions of time or granting or denying permission to file an amicus curiae brief. In other courts, the powers of a single judge can be more extensive; for example, in the New York Court of Appeals, a single judge rules on a defendant's motion for leave to appeal in a criminal case, and his or her decision is final.

It is relatively unusual for single judges or justices of lower courts to issue opinions explaining their rulings on these matters, but when they do, the designation "in chambers" is sometimes used.

== See also ==
- Supreme Court of the United States § Justices as circuit justices
- Procedures of the Supreme Court of the United States
- Shadow docket
