= Cert pool =

Process U.S. Supreme Court uses to screen petitions

The cert pool is a mechanism by which the Supreme Court of the United States manages the influx of petitions for certiorari ("cert") to the court. It was instituted in 1973, as one of the institutional reforms of Chief Justice Warren E. Burger on the suggestion of Justice Lewis F. Powell Jr.

== Purpose and operation ==
Each year, the Supreme Court receives thousands of petitions for certiorari; in 2001 the number stood at approximately 7,500, and had risen to 8,241 by October Term 2007. The court will ultimately grant approximately 80 to 100 of these petitions, (Note: See Procedures of the Supreme Court of the United States § Selection of cases.) in accordance with the rule of four. The workload of the court would make it difficult for each justice to read each petition; instead, in days gone by, each justice's law clerks would read the petitions and surrounding materials, and provide a short summary of the case, including a recommendation as to whether the justice should vote to hear the case.

This situation changed in the early 1970s, at the instigation of Chief Justice Warren E. Burger. In Burger's view, particularly in light of the increasing caseload, it was redundant to have nine separate memoranda prepared for each petition and thus (over objections from Justice William Brennan who chose to personally review all incoming petitions) Burger and Associate Justices Byron White, Harry Blackmun, Lewis Powell, and William Rehnquist created the cert pool. (Note: It is possible that Burger took inspiration for the cert pool from the manner in which the Court had been handling in forma pauperis petitions. From the tenure of Chief Justice Charles Evans Hughes until at least Burger's arrival, IFP petitions would go not to all chambers, but to the Chief Justice's chambers only, where the Chief's clerks would prepare a memo circulated to all other chambers, in a very similar manner to the cert pool's operation.) Today, all justices except Justices Samuel Alito and Neil Gorsuch participate in the cert pool. Alito withdrew from the pool procedure late in 2008, and Gorsuch has declined to participate since joining the court in 2017.

The operation of the cert pool is as follows: Each participating justice places his or her clerks in the pool. A copy of each petition received by the court goes to the pool, is assigned to a random clerk from the pool, and that clerk then prepares and circulates a memo for all of the justices participating in the pool. The writing law clerk may ask his or her justice to call for a response to the petition, or any justice may call for a response after the petition is circulated.

It tends to fall to the Chief Justice to "maintain" the pool when its workings go awry. Rehnquist chastised clerks for a number of practices, including memos that were tardy, too long, biased, left in unsecure locations, or swapped between chambers.

== Criticisms ==
The cert pool remedies several problems, but creates others:

- The fate of a petition may be disproportionately affected by which chambers' clerk writes the pool memo. Certain types of petitions may be more likely to succeed in the hands of more conservative or liberal clerks.
- Ken Starr, a former clerk to Warren Burger and solicitor general, has criticised the cert pool as having "unjustifiable influence" and being "unhealthily powerful", writing that "efficiency is achieved at the expense of informed judgment." Starr further argued that there was a "a hydraulic pressure to say no" while writing pool memos, stating that there were more benefits to recommending denials.
- Lyle Denniston of SCOTUSblog has argued that the cert pool is partially responsible for the court's shrunken (by historical standards) docket.
- Memos prepared for an audience of nine (or however many justices participate in the pool) cannot be as candid as private communications within chambers; moreover, they must be written in far more general terms than may be possible in memos between a justice and their clerk.
- Douglas A. Berman has argued that the cert pool results in a greater emphasis on capital cases on the court's docket due to clerks not encountering them with the same frequency in the lower courts.
