= Victim/Suspect =

- Directed by: Nancy Schwartzman
- Produced by: Nancy Schwartzman; Rachel de Leon; Christopher Clements; Julie Goldman; Alice Henty; Amanda Pike
- Cinematography: Jenni Morello
- Edited by: Inbal B. Lessner; Kim Roberts
- Music by: Morgan Kibby
- Production companies: Center for Investigative Reporting Studios; Motto Pictures
- Distributed by: Netflix
- Release dates: January 23, 2023 (Sundance); May 19, 2023
- Running time: 90 minutes
- Country: United States
- Language: English

Victim/Suspect is a 2023 American documentary film, directed and produced by Nancy Schwartzman. It follows young women who are charged by police with making false rape accusations, despite being truthful.

It had its world premiere at the 2023 Sundance Film Festival on January 23, 2023, and was released in a limited release on May 19, 2023, prior to streaming on Netflix on May 23, 2023.

== Premise ==
Rachel de Leon, a journalist at The Center for Investigative Reporting discovers a number of legal cases across the United States, where young women are charged by police for making false rape accusations, despite being truthful.

== Release ==
It had its world premiere at the 2023 Sundance Film Festival on January 23, 2023. It also screened at CPH:DOX on March 20, 2023. It was released in a limited release on May 19, 2023, prior to streaming on Netflix on May 23, 2023.

== Reception ==
Victim/Suspect received mostly positive reviews from critics. On Metacritic the film holds a score of 67 out of 100 based on five reviews, indicating "generally favorable reviews". On Rotten Tomatoes it holds a score of 79% based on 33 reviews, with an average score of 6.9 out of 10. The critics consensus reads "Although it's arguably not quite the documentary its subject deserves, Victim/Suspect remains an important and infuriating piece of journalism."
