= Joint appendix =

Submission of legal documents

A Joint Appendix typically refers to a submission of legal documents in support of a brief to a United States federal court of appeals or the Supreme Court of the United States.

== Description ==
When a petition for writ of certiorari is granted by the Supreme Court of the United States, a Joint Appendix must be prepared, per Supreme Court Rule 26. The Joint Appendix, commonly called the JA, accompanies the Petitioner's Merits Brief. The Joint Appendix allows the Supreme Court ease of access to relevant portions of the record. Similar to a merits brief, the Supreme Court requires a booklet-formatted and printed Joint Appendix.

A Joint Appendix usually contains: 1) a table of contents; 2) relevant docket entries in the courts below; and 3) relevant pleadings, jury instruction, findings, conclusions, opinions or the judgment under review. Rule 26.1.

"The Court, on its own motion or that of a party, may dispense with the requirement of a joint appendix and may permit a case to be heard on the original record (with such copies of the record, or relevant parts thereof, as the Court may require) or on the appendix used in the court below, if it conforms to the requirements of this Rule."
