= Roll Red Roll =

- Theatrical release poster
- Directed by: Nancy Schwartzman
- Produced by: Jessica Devaney; Steven Lake; Nancy Schwartzman; Maxyne Franklin
- Cinematography: Matt Bockelman
- Music by: Nima Fakhrara
- Production companies: Sunset Park Pictures; JustFilms/Ford Foundation; Bertha Doc Society; Fork Films; Artemis Rising Foundation; Chicken & Egg Pictures; Tribeca Film Institute
- Distributed by: Together Films; POV
- Release dates: April 22, 2018 (Tribeca); March 22, 2019 (United States)
- Running time: 80 minutes
- Country: United States
- Language: English

Roll Red Roll is a 2018 American documentary film, directed and produced by Nancy Schwartzman. It follows the Steubenville High School rape case.

The film had its world premiere at the Tribeca Film Festival on April 22, 2018. It was released in a limited release on March 22, 2019, by Together Films, prior to its debut on POV on PBS on June 17, 2019.

== Plot ==
The documentary looks into the Steubenville High School rape case that occurred in August 2012. It also documents Alexandria Goddard's investigation and documentation of the crimes through her true crime blog.

== Cast ==
- Alexandria Goddard
- Rachel Dissell
- J.P. Rigaud

== Release ==
The film had its world premiere at the Tribeca Film Festival on April 22, 2018. In February 2019, Together Films acquired U.S. distribution rights to the film, while POV acquired broadcast distribution rights to the film. The film was released in a limited release on March 22, 2019, prior to its debut on POV on PBS on June 17, 2019.

== Reception ==
=== Critical response ===
The review aggregator website Rotten Tomatoes reports an approval rating of 100%, based on 29 reviews, with an average of 8.3/10. Metacritic, which assigns a weighted average score, rates the film 83 out of 100, based on 9 reviews, indicating "Universal acclaim".

Jeannette Catsoulis of The New York Times wrote, "A tough but essential watch, “Roll Red Roll” documents how a sexual assault in a declining Appalachian town became an international cause célèbre." Owen Gleiberman of Variety wrote, "... piercingly relevant and disturbing documentary about an infamous high school rape case...". Oliver Jones of The Observer wrote, "And while it is good that a director as versed on the subject of consent as Schwartzman is bringing her unwavering eye to the problem, it makes it all the more painful that we seem even further away from solving the issue then we were on that fateful August night in Ohio seven years ago." Frank Scheck of The Hollywood Reporter wrote, "Difficult to watch, but essential viewing."

=== Accolades ===
Year	Award	Category	Result	Refs.
2018	Nantucket Film Festival	Adrienne Shelley Excellence in Filmmaking Award	Won	
2018	Monmouth Film Festival	Best Feature Documentary	Won	
2018	Middlebury New Filmmakers Festival	Clio Visualizing History Award	Won	
2018	BendFilm Festival	Best Feature	Won	
2018	Chagrin Documentary Film Festival	Best Film	Won	
2019	Cinema Eye Honors Awards, US	Spotlight Award	Nominated	
2019	Cleveland International Film Festival	Local Heroes Competition	Nominated	
2019	Cleveland International Film Festival	Excellence in Directing by a Woman	Nominated	
