= Death in Apartment 603: What Happened to Ellen Greenberg? =

2025 American documentary series

- Genre: Documentary
- Directed by: Nancy Schwartzman
- Music by: Nick Sena
- Country of origin: United States
- Original language: English
- No. of episodes: 3

Production
- Executive producers: Nancy Schwartzman; Elle Fanning; Dakota Fanning; Brittany Kahan Ward; Geno McDermott; Igal Svet; Jessica Roomberg; Caitlin Gold; Victoria Thompson; David Sloan
- Producers: Laura Dimon; Kendall Bosio; Kate Davis; Charlotte Maher Levy; Jonah McMichael; Nicholas Caprio
- Cinematography: Joe Hicks; Eric Wagner
- Editors: Brett Jacobsen; Jason Hardwick; Erin Perri
- Running time: 42 minutes
- Production companies: ABC News Studios; Lionsgate Alternative Television; Lewellen Pictures; Tanbark Pictures

Original release
- Network: Hulu
- Release: September 29, 2025

Death in Apartment 603: What Happened to Ellen Greenberg? is a 2025 American documentary miniseries directed and produced by Nancy Schwartzman. It explores the death of Ellen Greenberg, which was initially ruled as a suicide, as her family insists she was murdered.

It premiered on September 29, 2025, on Hulu.

== Premise ==
Ellen Greenberg was a school teacher who was found dead in her apartment. Greenberg sustained multiple stab wounds and various bruises. Her death was initially ruled as a suicide, with the case being closed. Greenberg's parents, Sandee and Josh appear in the series as they fight to reopen the investigation.

== Episodes ==
No.	Title	Directed by	Original release date
1	"Homicide or Suicide?"	Nancy Schwartzman	September 29, 2025
2	"The Strangest 911 Call I Ever Heard"	Nancy Schwartzman	September 29, 2025
3	"The Greenbergs v. The City of Philadelphia"	Nancy Schwartzman	September 29, 2025

== Production ==
The Greenbergs were approached by different filmmakers before deciding to go with Nancy Schwartzman. Production commenced in February 2025, as the lawsuit filed by the Greenbergs was settled. Information included in the series was pulled from public record or entered into evidence. All sides were invited to participate in the series, with Sam Goldberg alongside his friends and family, Philadelphia Police Department and Medical Examiner office, declining.

In July 2025, it was announced ABC News Studios and Hulu had ordered the series, with Schwartzman to direct and Elle Fanning and Dakota Fanning set to serve as executive producers under their Lewellen Pictures banner.

== Reception ==
=== Critical reception ===
Joel Keller of Decider suggested viewing the series writing: "The series is compelling because of how startling the mishandling of Ellen Greenberg’s case really was." Karina Adelgaard of Heaven of Horror gave the series four out of five stars, writing: "Watching it, I found myself getting angry on behalf of everyone who loved Ellen Greenberg."
