= Nancy Schwartzman =

American filmmaker

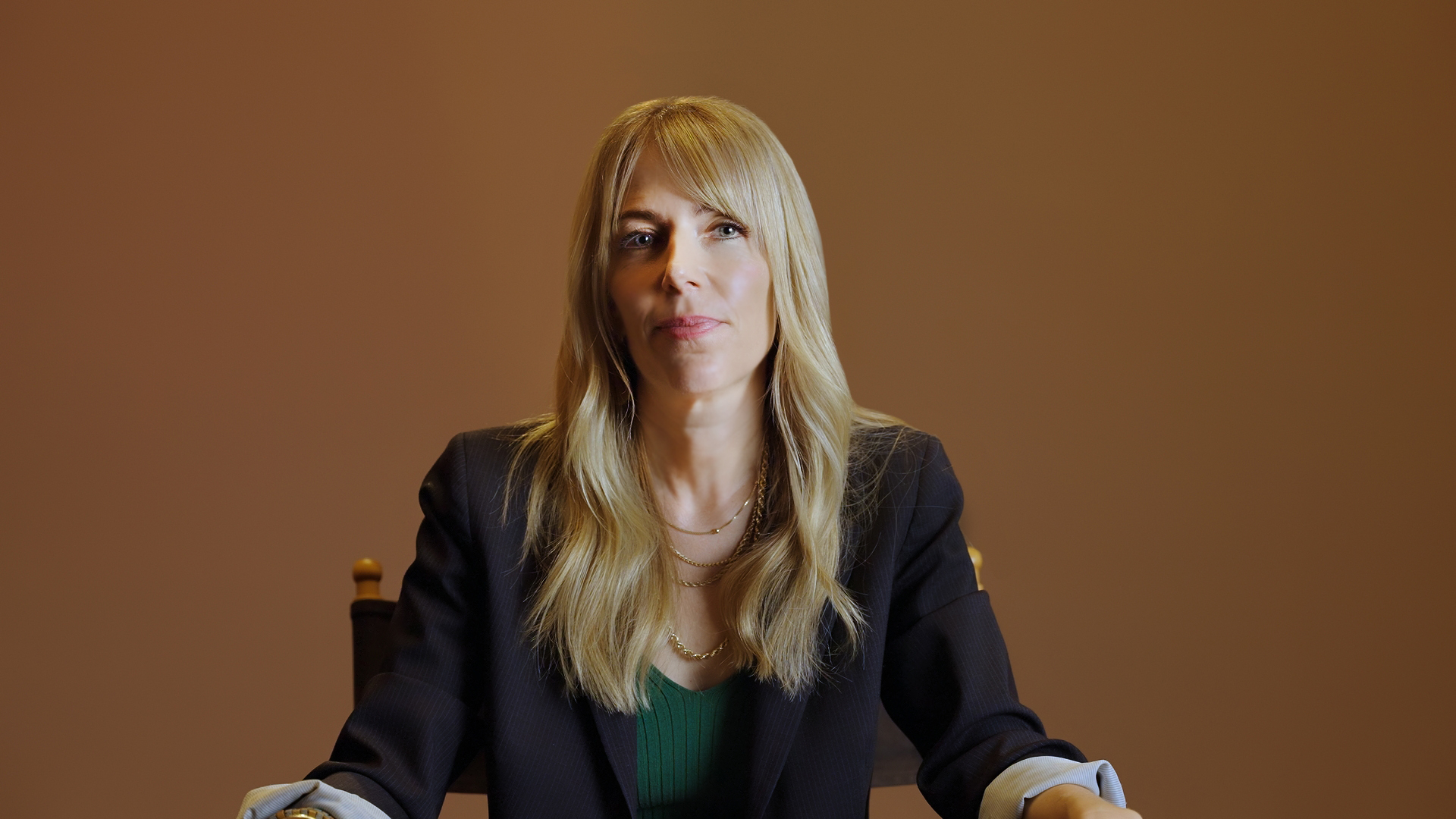
- Schwartzman in 2022
- Born: Miami, Florida, US
- Education: Columbia University
- Occupations: Documentary director; producer; media strategist

Nancy Schwartzman is an American documentary filmmaker. She is a member of the Directors Guild of America and the Academy of Motion Picture Arts and Sciences.

== Personal life ==
Schwartzman was raised in Bryn Mawr, Pennsylvania. She attended Harriton High School and Shipley School, and is a 1997 graduate alumni of Columbia University in New York City.

== Films ==
Schwartzman initially worked as a production assistant at Killer Films, contributing to Todd Solondz's Happiness and Todd Haynes' Velvet Goldmine. She also participated in social media advertising campaigns for the documentary films The Invisible War and Girl Model.

Schwartzman’s first film, a short documentary titled The Line inspired by her experiences with sexual assault in Israel, was included in a White House campaign. The film was completed in July 2009 and has been screened at the International Women's Film Festival in Israel, the Muslim Women and Sexuality Conference in Turkey, the Sex: Tech Conference in San Francisco, and the Men's Gender Equity and Anti-Violence Conference.

Schwartzman's second documentary, xoxosms, explores the lives and relationships of two young people while examining the impact of social networking technology. The film was produced by Cinereach and premiered on PBS POV in July 2013. (It was also featured in the BBC Radio 4 Digital Human series.)

Roll Red Roll, Schwartzman's first feature-length documentary, examines the cultural factors at play behind the Steubenville, Ohio, high school rape case. It premiered in 2018 at the Tribeca Film Festival and Hot Docs. Roll Red Roll was nominated for the Cinema Eye Honors Spotlight Award, and for a Peabody Award. It was available for streaming on Netflix. The impact campaign for Roll Red Roll received support from the Fledgling Fund, Bertha Foundation, Perspective, and the Ford Foundation.

Schwartzman also released a companion short film to Roll Red Roll, titled Anonymous Comes To Town, co-produced with the Tribeca Film Institute and fashion house Gucci's 'Chime for Change' campaign with The Guardian.

Schwartzman directed the short documentary Angeline, which tells the story of a woman who discovers, at the age of 30, that she has been lied to about her genetic identity after taking a 23andMe DNA test.

Schwartzman's 2023 documentary film, Victim/Suspect, premiered at the 2023 Sundance Film Festival, followed by a release on Netflix on May 23, 2023. The documentary focuses on Rachel de Leon, a journalist at The Center for Investigative Reporting, as she follows and investigates legal cases across the United States that involve women who have reported their sexual assaults to the police. It was nominated for the U.S. Documentary Grand Jury Prize at the Sundance Film Festival and the F:ACT Award at CPH:DOX., and won the 2024 RFK Journalism prize.

In 2024, Schwartzman directed and produced Sasha Reid and the Midnight Order, a series revolving around Sasha Reid and her society of young women who solve cold cases, analyze the minds of killers, and work to protect the vulnerable. Produced by XTR, the series premiered July 9, 2024, on Freeform.

In 2025, Schwartzman directed and produced Death in Apartment 603: What Happened to Ellen Greenberg?, a series revolving around the Death of Ellen Greenberg, executive produced by Elle Fanning and Dakota Fanning for ABC News Studios and Hulu.

== Media ==
In response to a spike in street violence in NYC, Schwartzman founded safestreets.org, though the website is now inactive. Schwartzman was also a founding editor and Creative Director of the print edition of Heeb magazine.

In 2011, Schwartzman co-created the app "Circle of 6", a free anti-violence app. The app won the 2011 White House 'Apps Against Abuse' Contest.
