= Sasha Reid and the Midnight Order =

American true crime documentary series

- Genre: Documentary
- Directed by: Nancy Schwartzman
- Starring: Sasha Reid; Anjali Arora; Ayah Ellithy; Hana Georgoulis; Marina Jarenova; Hasti Pourriahi; Florence Tang
- Music by: Nick Sena
- Country of origin: Canada
- Original language: English
- No. of seasons: 1
- No. of episodes: 5

Production
- Executive producers: Nancy Schwartzman; Maija Norris; Bryn Mooser; Justin Lacob; Kathleen Flood
- Producers: Amy Darling; Jasmine Luoma
- Cinematography: Patrick McLaughlin; Jay Ferguson
- Editors: Joe Langford; Nick Piotrowski; Mel Mel Sukekawa-Mooring; Mara Wollong; Martina Boyeras; Darshan Kembhavi; Alexander Meyers
- Production companies: XTR; Sunset Park Pictures

Original release
- Network: Freeform
- Release: July 9 – August 6, 2024

Sasha Reid and the Midnight Order is a true crime documentary series directed and produced by Nancy Schwartzman. It follows Dr. Sasha Reid, and her society of young women who band together to work outside the system to protect the vulnerable, dive into the minds of killers, and solve cold cases across Canada.

It premiered on July 9, 2024, on Freeform.

== Premise ==
Dr. Sasha Reid and her society of young women band together to protect the vulnerable, dive into the minds of killers, and solve cold cases.

== Cast ==
- Sasha Reid
- Anjali Arora
- Ayah Ellithy
- Hana Georgoulis
- Marina Jarenova
- Hasti Pourriahi
- Florence Tang

== Episodes ==
No.	Title	Directed by	Original release date	U.S. viewers (millions)
1	"I Think My Ex-Husband is a Serial Killer"	Nancy Schwartzman	July 9, 2024	N/A
2	"Stalking the Lone Wolf"	Nancy Schwartzman	July 16, 2024	N/A
3	"The Butcher of Port Coquitlam"	Nancy Schwartzman	July 23, 2024	N/A
4	"Nightmare at Piggy's Palace"	Nancy Schwartzman	July 30, 2024	N/A
5	"Let the Evidence Lead"	Nancy Schwartzman	August 6, 2024	N/A

== Production ==
In September 2023, it was announced Nancy Schwartzman had directed the series, with XTR set to produce, and Freeform to distribute.

== Reception ==
Melissa Camacho for Common Sense Media gave the series three out of five stars writing: "This true crime docuseries combines intellectually-driven sleuthing efforts with Hollywood-like style in an attempt to create a series that's as entertaining as it is smart, but the significance behind who they are and what they do sometimes gets lost, thanks to the lighting and camera work used to amp up the drama as they work a case." Joel Keller of Decider.com suggested streaming the series, writing: "Sasha Reid And The Midnight Order doesn’t need to be a slickly-made to communicate what Reid and her team do to help solve cold cases. But if you can get through that slick stuff, there’s a lot of good sleuthing to watch."
