= Maryland v. Baltimore Radio Show, Inc. =

- Supreme Court of the United States

Decided January 9, 1950
- Full case name: Maryland v. Baltimore Radio Show, Inc., et al.
- Citations: 338 U.S. 912 (more) 70 S. Ct. 252; 94 L. Ed. 562

Holding
- Denial of a writ of certiorari cannot be interpreted as anything other than a signal that fewer than four justices deemed it desirable to review the decision of the lower court. Such a denial indicates nothing about the merits or demerits of a case.

Court membership
- Chief Justice Fred M. Vinson Associate Justices Hugo Black · Stanley F. Reed; Felix Frankfurter · William O. Douglas; Robert H. Jackson · Harold H. Burton; Tom C. Clark · Sherman Minton

Case opinion
- Majority: Frankfurter, joined by a unanimous court

Maryland v. Baltimore Radio Show, Inc., 338 U.S. 912 (1950), was a United States Supreme Court case in which the court held that denial of a writ of certiorari cannot be interpreted as anything other than a signal that fewer than four justices deemed it desirable to review the decision of the lower court. Such a denial indicates nothing about the merits or demerits of a case.

== Facts of the case ==
Following the murders of two young girls (one in Washington, D.C. and another ten days later in nearby Baltimore, Maryland), there was "widespread and compelling public interest" in the case and "people throughout the City were outraged. Not only were they outraged, but they were terrified." Mr. Connelly of the Baltimore Radio Show announced on the radio that Eugene James had been apprehended and charged with the Baltimore murder and that he had confessed, had a long criminal record, and had gone to the scene, reenacted the crime, and dug up the murder weapon.

The trial court inquired whether the broadcast presented a clear and present danger to the administration of justice and concluded that, while it didn't have an effect on the judges in this case, it had an effect on all potential jurors and therefore deprived the defendant of the right to a jury trial. Removal wouldn't have worked, because the broadcast reached everyone in the state. Voir dire wouldn't have worked because it would require defense counsel to ask a potential juror whether he had heard a radio broadcast to the effect that his client had confessed to this crime. Therefore this broadcast was deemed an obstruction of justice.

The Court of Appeals of Maryland reversed the conviction of the radio broadcasters for contempt of court and obstruction of justice, stating that the power to punish for contempt was limited by the First and Fourteenth Amendments. The state petitioned for a writ of certiorari which was denied by the Supreme Court.

== Majority opinion ==
The denial of certiorari has no other significance than to signal that fewer than four members of the Court deemed it desirable to review a decision of the lower court. This is a matter of “sound judicial discretion.” Considerations for denial of certiorari can be varied. Additionally, dissent on a denial of certiorari should not be read as indicating that only one person thought the petition should be granted.

Since reasons can conflict, some have suggested that the Court give reasons for denial. For practical reasons, the Court has chosen not to do so, reasoning that it would take too much time away from its more important duties.
