= Rule of four =

US Supreme Court certiorari practice

The rule of four is a US Supreme Court practice that permits four of the nine justices to grant a writ of certiorari. It has the specific purpose to prevent a majority of the Court's members from controlling their docket.

The rule of four is not required by the US Constitution, any law, or even the Court's own published rules. Rather, it is a custom that has been observed since the Court was given discretion on hearing appeals by the Judiciary Act of 1891, Judiciary Act of 1925, and the Supreme Court Case Selections Act of 1988.

The "Rule of Four" has been explained by various Justices in judicial opinions throughout the years. For example, Justice Felix Frankfurter described the rule as follows: "The 'rule of four' is not a command of Congress. It is a working rule devised by the Court as a practical mode of determining that a case is deserving of review, the theory being that if four Justices find that a legal question of general importance is raised, that is ample proof that the question has such importance. This is a fair enough rule of thumb on the assumption that four Justices find such importance on an individualized screening of the cases sought to be reviewed."

The Rule of Four in general has remained constant for some time in which it takes at least four affirmative votes to grant a petition for certiorari, but the ancillary aspects of it have changed throughout the years, and Justices have not always agreed about these aspects.

A good example is found in dueling opinions (for themselves alone, not opinions of the Court), in Rogers v. Missouri Pac. R. Co., Justice Frankfurter and Justice John Marshall Harlan II discussed their understandings of the conventions surrounding the Rule of Four. In particular, the Justices disagreed as to whether once certiorari has been properly granted by the vote of four Justices, all Justices were then to rule on the merits of the petition, rather than to vote to dismiss it. Justice Frankfurter did not agree that Justices were required to reach the merits of a petition, even if it was properly granted, but Justice Harlan disagreed and felt that even if he disagreed with a grant of certiorari, the Rule of Four "requires that once certiorari has been granted a case should be disposed of on the premise that it is properly heard, in the absence of considerations appearing which were not manifest or fully apprehended at the time certiorari was granted."
