= Certiorari =

Court process to seek judicial review

In law, certiorari is a court process to seek judicial review of a decision of a lower court or government agency. Certiorari comes from the name of a prerogative writ in England, issued by a superior court to direct that the record of the lower court be sent to the superior court for review.

Derived from the English common law, certiorari is prevalent in countries using, or influenced by, the common law. It has evolved in the legal system of each nation, as court decisions and statutory amendments are made. In modern law, certiorari is recognized in many jurisdictions, including England and Wales (now called a "quashing order"), Canada, India, Ireland, the Philippines and the United States. With the expansion of administrative law in the 19th and 20th centuries, the writ of certiorari has gained broader use in many countries, to review the decisions of administrative bodies as well as lower courts.

== Etymology ==
The term certiorari (US English: /ˌsɜːrʃiəˈrɛəri/, /-ˈrɑːrɪ/, or /-ˈrɛəraɪ/; (Note: A 2014 survey of then current and former U.S. Supreme Court justices found six different variations in pronunciation among 11 justices.) UK English: /ˌsɜːrtioʊˈrɛəraɪ/ or /-ˈrɑːrɪ/) comes from the words used at the beginning of these writs when they were written in Latin: certiorari [volumus] "[we wish] to be made more certain". Certiorari is the present passive infinitive of the Latin verb certioro, certiorare ("to inform, apprise, show"). It is often abbreviated cert. in the United States, particularly in relation to applications to the Supreme Court of the United States for review of a lower court decision.

== Origins ==
=== English prerogative writ ===
In English common law, certiorari was a supervisory writ, serving to keep "all inferior jurisdictions within the bounds of their authority ... [protecting] the liberty of the subject, by speedy and summary interposition". In England and Wales, the Court of King's Bench was tasked with the duty of supervising all lower courts, and had power to issue all writs necessary for the discharge of that duty; the justices of that Court appeared to have no discretion as to whether it was heard, as long as an application for a bill of certiorari met established criteria, as it arose from their duty of supervision.

As time went on, certiorari evolved into an important rule of law remedy:

Certiorari is used to bring up into the High Court the decision of some inferior tribunal or authority in order that it may be investigated. If the decision does not pass the test, it is quashed – that is to say, it is declared completely invalid, so that no one need respect it. The underlying policy is that all inferior courts and authorities have only limited jurisdiction or powers and must be kept within their legal bounds. This is the concern of the Crown, for the sake of orderly administration of justice, but it is a private complaint which sets the Crown in motion.

== Australia ==
In Australia, the power to issue certiorari is part of the inherent jurisdiction of the superior courts.

== Canada ==
In Canada, certiorari is a rarely-used power, part of the inherent jurisdiction of the superior courts. It is usually used to cancel a lower court's decision because of an obvious mistake.

In R. v. Awashish, 2018 SCC 45, the Supreme Court of Canada restricted the use of certiorari in criminal matters. It ruled that certiorari can only be used to correct jurisdictional errors, i.e. when a court makes a decision that is out of its power to make; it cannot be used to correct legal errors, i.e. where a court makes a decision it is allowed to make, but decides incorrectly. The latter type of error can only be challenged through an appeal, once the court makes a final decision in the case. This is part of a general prohibition on interlocutory appeals in criminal matters. Certiorari is also available if a decision affects the rights of a third party who would not have standing to appeal the decision. The Supreme Court declined to decide whether certiorari would be available to address a legal error that threatens irreparable harm to a party's rights that could not be cured on appeal.

== England and Wales ==
In the courts of England and Wales, the remedy of certiorari evolved into a general remedy for the correction of plain error, to bring decisions of an inferior court, tribunal, or public authority before the superior court for review so that the court can determine whether to quash such decisions.

Reflecting this evolution in usage as a remedy after judicial review nullifying a decision of a public body, in England and Wales, orders or writs of certiorari were renamed "quashing orders" by the Civil Procedure (Modification of Supreme Court Act 1981) Order 2004, which amended the Senior Courts Act 1981.

== India ==
The Constitution of India vests the power to issue certiorari in the Supreme Court of India and High courts, for the purpose of enforcing the fundamental rights guaranteed by Part III of the Constitution against the state. The Parliament of India has the authority to give a similar certiorari power to any other court to enforce the fundamental rights, in addition to the certiorari power of the constitutional Courts.

In addition to the power to issue certiorari to protect fundamental rights, the Supreme Court and the High Courts all have jurisdiction to issue certiorari for the protection of other legal rights.

== New Zealand ==
When the High Court of New Zealand, known until 1980 as the Supreme Court, was established as a superior court in 1841, it had inherent jurisdiction to issue certiorari to control inferior courts and tribunals. The common law jurisdiction to issue certiorari was modified by statute in 1972, when the New Zealand Parliament passed the Judicature Amendment Act. This Act created a new procedural mechanism, known as an "application for review", which could be used in place of certiorari and the other prerogative writs. The Judicature Amendment Act did not abolish certiorari and the other writs, but it was expected that as the legal profession adapted to the use of the new application for review, the writs would cease to be used.

== Philippines ==
The Philippines has adapted the extraordinary writ of certiorari in civil actions under its Rules of Court, as the procedure to seek judicial review from the Supreme Court of the Philippines.

== United States ==
=== Federal courts ===
Associate Justice James Wilson (1742–1798) was the person primarily responsible for the drafting of Article Three of the United States Constitution, which describes the judicial branch of the US federal government. He wrote:

In every judicial department, well arranged and well organized, there should be a regular, progressive, gradation of jurisdiction; and one supreme tribunal should superintend and govern all the others.

An arrangement in this manner is proper for two reasons:

1. The supreme tribunal produces and preserves a uniformity of decision through the whole judicial system.
2. It confines and supports every inferior court within the limits of its just jurisdiction.

If no superintending tribunal of this nature were established, different courts might adopt different and even contradictory rules of decision; and the distractions, springing from these different and contradictory rules, would be without remedy and without end. Opposite determinations of the same question, in different courts, would be equally final and irreversible.

In the United States, certiorari is most often seen as the writ that the Supreme Court of the United States issues to a lower court to review the lower court's judgment for legal error (reversible error) and review where no appeal is available as a matter of right. Before the Judiciary Act of 1891, the cases that could reach the Supreme Court were heard as a matter of right, meaning that the Court was required to issue a decision in each of those cases. That is, the Court had to review all properly presented appeals on the merits, hear oral argument, and issue decisions. As the United States expanded in the nineteenth century, the federal judicial system became increasingly strained, and the Supreme Court had a backlog of cases several years long. The Act solved these problems by transferring most of the court's direct appeals to the newly created circuit courts of appeals, whose decisions in those cases would normally be final. The Supreme Court did not completely give up its judiciary authority because it gained the ability to review the decisions of the courts of appeals at its discretion through writ of certiorari.

Since the Judiciary Act of 1925 and the Supreme Court Case Selections Act of 1988, most cases cannot be appealed to the Supreme Court of the United States as a matter of right. A party who wants the Supreme Court to review a decision of a federal or state court files a "petition for a writ of certiorari" in the Supreme Court. A "petition" is printed in booklet format and 40 copies are filed with the Court. If the Court grants the petition, the case is scheduled for the filing of briefs and for oral argument. A minimum of four of the nine justices is required to grant a writ of certiorari, referred to as the "rule of four". The court denies the vast majority of petitions and thus leaves the decision of the lower court to stand without review; it takes roughly 80 to 150 cases each term. In the term that concluded in June 2009, for example, 8,241 petitions were filed, with a grant rate of approximately 1.1 percent. Cases on the paid certiorari docket are substantially more likely to be granted than those on the in forma pauperis docket. The Supreme Court is generally careful to choose only cases over which the Court has jurisdiction and which the Court considers sufficiently important, such as cases involving deep constitutional questions, to merit the use of its limited resources, utilizing tools such as the cert pool. While both appeals of right and cert petitions often present several alleged errors of the lower courts for appellate review, the court normally grants review of only one or two questions presented in a certiorari petition.

The Supreme Court sometimes grants a writ of certiorari to resolve a "circuit split", when the federal appeals courts in two (or more) federal judicial circuits have ruled differently in similar situations. These are often called "percolating issues".

Certiorari is sometimes informally referred to as cert., and cases warranting the Supreme Court's attention as "cert. worthy". The granting of a writ does not necessarily mean that the Supreme Court disagrees with the decision of the lower court. Granting a writ of certiorari means merely that at least four of the justices have determined that the circumstances described in the petition are sufficient to warrant review by the Court.

Conversely, the Supreme Court's denial of a petition for a writ of certiorari is sometimes misunderstood as implying that the Supreme Court approves the decision of the lower court. As the Court explained in Missouri v. Jenkins, such a denial "imports no expression of opinion upon the merits of the case". In particular, a denial of a writ of certiorari means that no binding precedent is created by the denial itself, and the lower court's decision is treated as mandatory authority only within the geographical (or in the case of the Federal Circuit, subject-specific) jurisdiction of that court. The reasons for why a denial of certiorari cannot be treated as implicit approval were set forth in Maryland v. Baltimore Radio Show, Inc. (1950), in which the Court explained the many rationales which could underlie the denial of a writ which have nothing to do with the merits of the case.

=== State courts ===
Some United States state court systems use the same terminology, but in others, writ of review, leave to appeal, or certification for appeal is used in place of writ of certiorari as the name for discretionary review of a lower court's judgment. The Supreme Court of Pennsylvania uniquely uses the terms allocatur (informally) and "allowance of appeal" (formally) for the same process. A handful of states lack intermediate appellate courts; in most of these, their supreme courts operate under a mandatory review regime, in which the supreme court must take all appeals in order to preserve the loser's traditional right to one appeal (except in criminal cases where the defendant was acquitted). Virginia has an intermediate appeals court, but operates under discretionary review except in family law and administrative cases. Mandatory review remains in place in all states where the death penalty exists; in those states, a sentence of death is automatically appealed to the state's highest court.

In two states without an intermediate appeals court (New Hampshire and West Virginia), the Supreme Court used to operate under discretionary review in all cases, whether civil or criminal. This meant that there was no right of appeal in either state, with the only exception being death penalty cases in New Hampshire; West Virginia abolished its death penalty in 1965. New Hampshire transitioned to mandatory review for the vast majority of cases beginning in 2004, while West Virginia transitioned to mandatory review for all cases beginning in 2010.

Texas is an unusual exception to the rule that denial of certiorari by the state supreme court normally does not imply approval or disapproval of the merits of the lower court's decision. In March 1927, the Texas Legislature enacted a law directing the Texas Supreme Court to summarily refuse to hear applications for writs of error when it believed the Court of Appeals opinion correctly stated the law. Thus, since June 1927, over 4,100 decisions of the Texas Courts of Appeals have become valid binding precedent of the Texas Supreme Court itself because the high court refused applications for writ of error rather than denying them and thereby signaled that it approved of their holdings as the law of the state.

While Texas' unique practice saved the state supreme court from having to hear relatively minor cases just to create uniform statewide precedents on those issues, it also makes for lengthy citations to the opinions of the Courts of Appeals, since the subsequent writ history of the case must always be noted (e.g., no writ, writ refused, writ denied, etc.) in order for the reader to determine at a glance whether the cited opinion is binding precedent only in the district of the Court of Appeals in which it was decided, or binding precedent for the entire state. In contrast, California, Florida, and New York solved the problem of creating uniform precedent by simply holding that the first intermediate appellate court to reach a novel question of law always sets binding precedent for the entire state, unless and until another intermediate appellate court expressly disagrees with the first one. Meanwhile, some states, such as Pennsylvania and New Jersey, avoid the issue entirely by eschewing regionalized appellate courts; the intermediate appellate courts in these states may hear cases from all parts of the state within their subject-matter jurisdiction.

=== Administrative law ===
In the administrative law context, the common-law writ of certiorari was historically used by lower courts in the United States for judicial review of decisions made by an administrative agency after an adversarial hearing. Some states have retained this use of the writ of certiorari in state courts, while others have replaced it with statutory procedures. In the federal courts, this use of certiorari has been abolished and replaced by a civil action under the Administrative Procedure Act in a United States district court or in some circumstances a petition for review in a United States court of appeals.

In 1936, the Supreme Court of California held that this use of certiorari was unconstitutional under the Constitution of California, then in 1939 approved of its replacement with mandate (California's version of mandamus).

== See also ==
- Allocatur
- Certiorari before judgment
- Joint appendix
- Petition for review
- Subpoena ad testificandum
- Subpoena duces tecum
