= Allocatur =

In law, allocatur (from med. Lat. allocatur, "it is allowed") refers to the allowance of a writ or other pleading. It may also designate a certificate given by a taxing master, at the termination of an action, for the allowance of costs.

The 1910 Black's Law Dictionary (Second Edition) described it as: "A word formerly used to denote that a writ or order was allowed", as well as a word "denoting the allowance by a master or prothonotary of a bill referred for his consideration, whether touching costs, damages, or matter of account". The dictionary also defined a "Special allocatur" as the "special allowance of a writ (particularly a writ of error) which is required in some particular cases" and an "Allocatur exigent" as a kind of writ "anciently issued in outlawry proceedings, on the return of the original writ of exigent".

== Pennsylvania ==
In Pennsylvania courts, the term is still commonly used to denote permission for an appeal to the Pennsylvania Supreme Court, even though the procedure for obtaining discretionary review in the court is now called a petition for allowance of appeal. See Pennsylvania Rule of Appellate Procedure 1112. In most other American courts, the term certiorari is used.
