= Supreme Court Case Selections Act of 1988 =

US federal law

- Long title: An Act to improve the administration of justice by providing greater discretion to the Supreme Court in selecting the cases it will review, and for other purposes.
- Enacted by: the 100th United States Congress

Citations
- Public law: 100-352
- Statutes at Large: 102 Stat. 662

Codification
- Titles amended: 28 U.S.C.: Judiciary and Judicial Procedure
- U.S.C. sections amended: 28 U.S.C. § 1257

Legislative history
- Introduced in the Senate as S. 952 by Howell Heflin (D–AL) on April 8, 1987; Committee consideration by Senate Judiciary (reported Mar. 16, 1988) and House Judiciary (reported May 26, 1988); Passed the Senate on March 18, 1988 (voice vote); Passed the House on June 7, 1988 (voice vote); Signed into law by President Ronald Reagan on June 27, 1988

The Supreme Court Case Selections Act of 1988 (Pub. L. 100–352, 102 Stat. 662, enacted June 27, 1988, codified at 28 U.S.C. § 1257) is an act of Congress that eliminated appeals as of right from state court decisions to the Supreme Court of the United States. After the Act took effect, in most cases, the only avenue by which a litigant could obtain review of most lower court decisions was through the writ of certiorari, which was granted at the discretion of the Supreme Court, rather than available to the litigant as a matter of right.

The Act amended 28 U.S.C. § 1257 to eliminate the right of appeal to the Supreme Court from certain state-court judgments. Prior to the enactment of the Act, if the highest state court had found either a federal statute or treaty to be invalid or a state statute not to be invalid in the face of federal law, the party that had not prevailed had had the right to appeal to the U.S. Supreme Court. After the enactment of the Act, the only appeal as of right to the Supreme Court that still exists, pursuant to 28 U.S.C. § 1253, are cases appealing "an interlocutory or permanent injunction in any civil action, suit or proceeding required by any Act of Congress to be heard and determined by a district court of three judges."

== Textual changes ==
Prior to the enactment of the Act, § 1257 read as follows:

§ 1257. State courts; appeal; certiorari
Final judgments or decrees rendered by the highest court of a State in which a decision could be had, may be reviewed by the Supreme Court as follows:
1. By appeal, where is drawn in question the validity of a treaty or statute of the United States and the decision is against its validity.
2. By appeal, where is drawn in question the validity of a statute of any state on the ground of its being repugnant to the Constitution, treaties or laws of the United States, and the decision is in favor of its validity.
3. By writ of certiorari, where the validity of a treaty or statute of the United States is drawn in question or where the validity of a State statute is drawn in question on the ground of its being repugnant to the Constitution, treaties or laws of the United States, or where any title, right, privilege or immunity is specially set up or claimed under the Constitution, treaties or statutes of, or commission held or authority exercised under, the United States.
For the purposes of this section, the term "highest court of a State" includes the District of Columbia Court of Appeals.
The Act removed subsections (1) and (2), which had provided for the right of appeal, struck "appeal" from the section catchline, and reorganized the remaining text:
§ 1257. State courts; certiorari
1. Final judgments or decrees rendered by the highest court of a State in which a decision could be had, may be reviewed by the Supreme Court by writ of certiorari where the validity of a treaty or statute of the United States is drawn in question or where the validity of a statute of any State is drawn in question on the ground of its being repugnant to the Constitution, treaties, or laws of the United States, or where any title, right, privilege, or immunity is specially set up or claimed under the Constitution or the treaties or statutes of, or any commission held or authority exercised under, the United States.
2. For the purposes of this section, the term "highest court of a State" includes the District of Columbia Court of Appeals.

== See also ==
- Judiciary Act of 1925
