= Judiciary Act of 1925 =

Law to allow U.S. Supreme Court discretion in certiorari for most types of cases

- Other short titles: Judges' Bill · Certiorari Act of 1925
- Long title: An Act To amend the Judicial Code, and further to define the jurisdiction of the circuit courts of appeals and of the Supreme Court, and for other purposes.
- Nicknames: The Judges' Bill
- Enacted by: the 68th United States Congress
- Effective: May 13, 1925

Citations
- Public law: Public Law 68-415
- Statutes at Large: 43 Stat. 936

Codification
- Acts amended: Judicial Code of 1911

Legislative history
- Introduced in the Senate as S. 2060 by Albert B. Cummins, R‑IA, on January 10, 1924; Committee consideration by Senate Committee on the Judiciary; Passed the Senate on February 3, 1925 (76–1); Passed the House on February 2, 1925 (Voice vote); Signed into law by President Calvin Coolidge on February 13, 1925

The Judiciary Act of 1925 (43 Stat. 936), also known as the Judge's Bill or Certiorari Act, was an act of the United States Congress that sought to reduce the workload of the Supreme Court of the United States.

== Background ==
Although the Judiciary Act of 1891 (which created the United States courts of appeals and rendered a small part of the Supreme Court's jurisdiction discretionary subject to grant of writ of certiorari) had relieved pressure on the Supreme Court's docket, the court remained obliged to rule:

on the merits all cases appealed to it over which it had jurisdiction … [after the 1891 act, ] Congress gave the Court discretionary review authority over appellate decisions in diversity, patent, revenue, criminal and admiralty cases. Parties wishing to appeal such cases would file a petition for certiorari, which the Court could grant or deny without passing on the merits.

Nonetheless, the number of appeals was a one-way upward ratchet, and the Justices argued that the only way to fix the problem once and for all was to have the Court conduct virtually all of its business by way of writ of certiorari.

== Proposal ==
In December 1921, Chief Justice William Howard Taft appointed three justices to draw up a proposal that would amend the Judicial Code of the United States, and define further the jurisdiction of the nation's circuit courts. The resulting bill, created by Justices Willis Van Devanter, James Clark McReynolds, and George Sutherland, took many trips to Congress (which were not lengthy because until 1935 the Supreme Court had its chambers in the U.S. Capitol) by the Chief Justice and his associates. Taft also journeyed to the United Kingdom in 1922, to study the procedural structure of British courts.

When approved in 1925, "the Judges Bill", as it was known, dramatically shrank the number of cases coming directly to the court, yet retained a mandatory oversight on cases that raised questions involving federal jurisdiction. It called for the circuit courts of appeals to have appellate jurisdiction to review 'by appeal or writ of error' final decisions in the district courts, as well as for the district courts of Alaska, Hawaii, Puerto Rico, China, the United States Virgin Islands, and the Panama Canal Zone. The circuit courts were also empowered to modify, enforce or set aside orders of the Interstate Commerce Commission, the Federal Reserve Board, and the Federal Trade Commission. The bill further provided that "A final judgment or decree in any suit in the highest court of a State in which a decision in the suit could be had, where is drawn in question the validity of a treaty or statute of the United States may be reviewed by the Supreme Court on a writ of error." Lastly, cases involving final decrees which brought into question the validity of a wide range of Federal or state treaties would come to the Court by certiorari. Four justices would be required to vote affirmatively to accept petitions, which meant that the Court's agenda would now be controlled by "judicial review" and that thousands of cases clogging the dockets could now be cut to hundreds that met the new requirements.

The Chief Justice vigorously pursued the passage of this bill, taking his fellow justices with him to Congress over the four years in which the bill was discussed. Congress chose to pass the act in 1925. This action rendered the majority of the Supreme Court's workload discretionary by removing the possibility of direct appeal to the court in most circumstances. Henceforth, pursuant to §237(b) of the act, appellants would file petitions for writs of certiorari with the Supreme Court, which would be accepted at the discretion of four of the nine Justices. "No longer did the Court have to hear almost every case an unhappy litigant presented to it. Instead, for the most part, the Court could select only those relatively few cases involving issues important enough to require a decision from the Supreme Court."

Few U.S. Supreme Court decisions make any comment on the revocation of the right to appeal to the highest court. One U.S. Supreme court decision, however, did comment on this issue: Moore v. Fidelity & Deposit Co., 272 U.S. 317, 321 (1926). Justice Brandeis said in that case: "The general purpose of the Act of 1925 was to relieve this Court by limiting further the absolute right to a review by it."

== See also ==
- Supreme Court Case Selections Act
