= 2020 term United States Supreme Court opinions of Sonia Sotomayor =

The 2020 term of the Supreme Court of the United States began October 5, 2020, and concluded October 3, 2021. This was the twelfth term of Associate Justice Sonia Sotomayor's tenure on the Court.
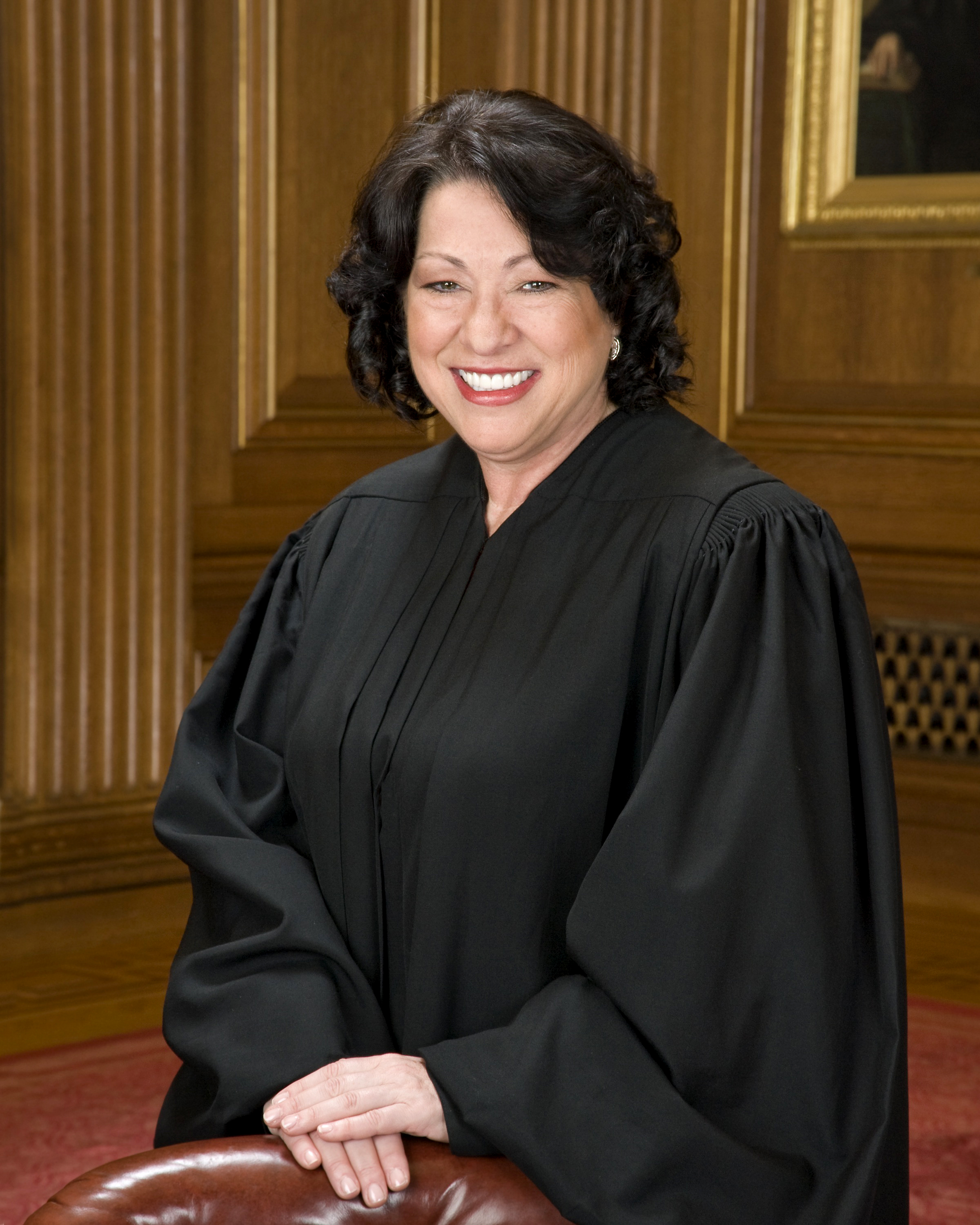

Sonia Sotomayor 2020 term statistics

6	Majority or plurality	6	Concurrence	6	Other
18	Dissent	3	Concurrence/dissent	Total =	39
Bench opinions = 20		Opinions relating to orders = 19		In-chambers opinions = 0
Unanimous opinions: 1		Most joined by: Kagan (16)		Least joined by: Barrett (2 in full, 1 in part)

Type	Case	Citation	Issues	Joined by	Other opinions
	Kaur v. Maryland	592 U.S. ___ (2020)			
Sotomayor filed a statement respecting the Court's denial of certiorari.
	Henness v. DeWine	592 U.S. ___ (2020)			
Sotomayor filed a statement respecting the Court's denial of certiorari.
	Ross v. National Urban League	592 U.S. ___ (2020)			
Sotomayor dissented from the Court's grant of application for stay.
	Merrill v. People First of Alabama	592 U.S. ___ (2020)		Breyer, Kagan	
Sotomayor dissented from the Court's grant of application for stay.
	Valentine v. Collier	592 U.S. ___ (2020)		Kagan	
Sotomayor dissented from the Court's denial of application to vacate stay.
	Roman Catholic Diocese of Brooklyn v. Cuomo	592 U.S. ___ (2020)		Kagan	per curiam; Gorsuch; Kavanaugh; Roberts; Breyer
Sotomayor dissented from the Court's grant of application for injunctive relief.
	Carney v. Adams	592 U.S. ___ (2020)			Breyer
	Rutledge v. Pharmaceutical Care Management Assn.	592 U.S. ___ (2020)		Roberts, Thomas, Breyer, Alito, Kagan, Gorsuch, Kavanaugh	Thomas
	Bernard v. United States	592 U.S. ___ (2020)			
Sotomayor dissented from the Court's denial of certiorari and application for stay of execution.
	Bourgeois v. Watson	592 U.S. ___ (2020)		Kagan	
Sotomayor dissented from the Court's denial of certiorari and application for stay of execution.
	FDA v. American College of Obstetricians and Gynecologists	592 U.S. ___ (2021)		Kagan	Roberts
Sotomayor dissented from the Court's grant of application for stay.
	Chicago v. Fulton	592 U.S. ___ (2021)			Alito
	United States v. Higgs	592 U.S. ___ (2021)			Breyer
Sotomayor dissented from the Court's grant of certiorari before judgment and summary reversal, and application to vacate stay of execution.
	Francois v. Wilkinson	592 U.S. ___ (2021)			
Sotomayor dissented from the Court's denial of application for stay of removal.
	Salinas v. Railroad Retirement Bd.	592 U.S. ___ (2021)		Roberts, Breyer, Kagan, Kavanaugh	Thomas
	Brownback v. King	592 U.S. ___ (2021)	Federal Tort Claims Act		Thomas
	Smith v. Titus	592 U.S. ___ (2021)			
Sotomayor dissented from the Court's denial of certiorari.
	Longoria v. United States	592 U.S. ___ (2021)		Gorsuch	
Sotomayor filed a statement respecting the Court's denial of certiorari.
	Facebook, Inc. v. Duguid	592 U.S. ___ (2021)		Roberts, Thomas, Breyer, Kagan, Gorsuch, Kavanaugh, Barett	Alito
	Whatley v. Warden, Georgia Diagnostic and Classification Prison	593 U.S. ___ (2021)			
Sotomayor dissented from the Court's denial of certiorari.
	Brown v. Polk County	593 U.S. ___ (2021)			
Sotomayor filed a statement respecting the Court's denial of certiorari.
	Carr v. Saul	593 U.S. ___ (2021)		Roberts, Alito, Kagan, Kavanaugh; Thomas, Breyer, Gorsuch, Barrett (in part)	Thomas; Breyer
	Jones v. Mississippi	593 U.S. ___ (2021)		Breyer, Kagan	Kavanaugh; Thomas
	Calvert v. Texas	593 U.S. ___ (2021)			
Sotomayor filed a statement respecting the Court's denial of certiorari.
	BP P.L.C. v. Mayor and City Council of Baltimore	593 U.S. ___ (2021)			Gorsuch
	CIC Servs., LLC v. IRS	593 U.S. ___ (2021)			Kagan; Kavanaugh
	Johnson v. Precythe	593 U.S. ___ (2021)		Breyer, Kagan	Breyer
Sotomayor dissented from the Court's denial of certiorari.
	United States v. Palomar-Santiago	593 U.S. ___ (2021)		Unanimous	
	National Coalition for Men v. Selective Service System	593 U.S. ___ (2021)		Breyer, Kavanaugh	
Sotomayor filed a statement respecting the Court's denial of certiorari.
	Terry v. United States	593 U.S. ___ (2021)			Thomas
	Greer v. United States	593 U.S. ___ (2021)			Kavanaugh
	Nestlé USA, Inc. v. Doe	593 U.S. ___ (2021)		Breyer, Kagan	Thomas; Gorsuch; Alito
	Goldman Sachs Group, Inc. v. Arkansas Teacher Retirement System	594 U.S. ___ (2021)			Barrett; Gorsuch
	Collins v. Yellen	594 U.S. ___ (2021)		Breyer	Alito; Thomas; Gorsuch; Kagan
	Yellen v. Confederated Tribes of the Chehalis Reservation	594 U.S. ___ (2021)		Roberts, Breyer, Kavanaugh, Barrett; Alito (in part)	Gorsuch
	Hernandez v. Peery	594 U.S. ___ (2021)			
Sotomayor dissented from the Court's denial of certiorari.
	Americans for Prosperity Foundation v. Bonta	594 U.S. ___ (2021)		Breyer, Kagan	Roberts; Thomas; Alito
	Dunn v. Reeves	594 U.S. ___ (2021)		Kagan	per curiam
	Whole Woman's Health v. Jackson	594 U.S. ___ (2021)		Breyer, Kagan	Roberts; Breyer; Kagan
Sotomayor dissented from the Court's denial of application for injunctive relief.
