= 2020 term United States Supreme Court opinions of Neil Gorsuch =

The 2020 term of the Supreme Court of the United States began October 5, 2020, and concluded October 3, 2021. This was the fifth term of Associate Justice Neil Gorsuch's tenure on the Court.
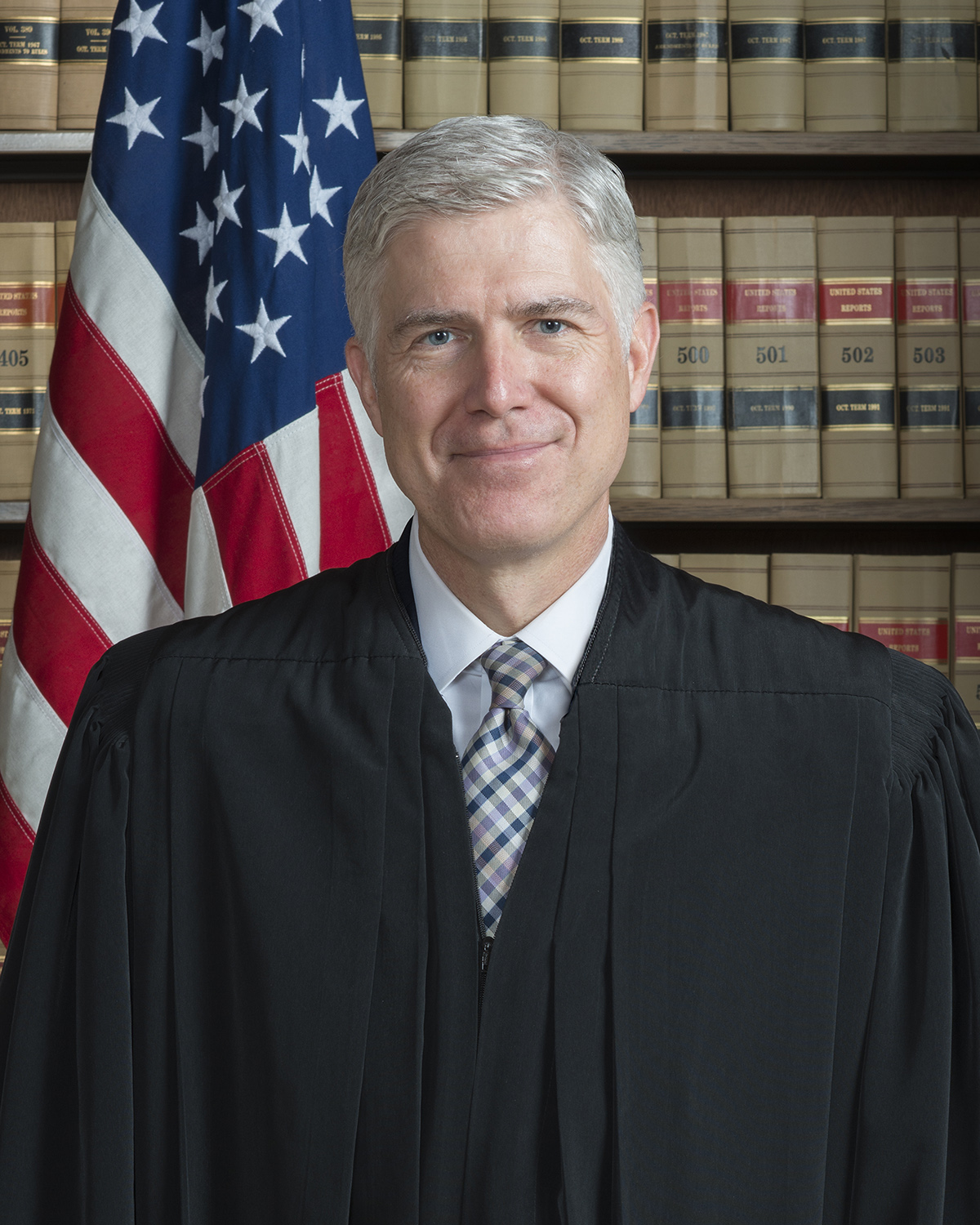

Neil Gorsuch 2020 term statistics

6	Majority or plurality	10	Concurrence	2	Other
7	Dissent	2	Concurrence/dissent	Total =	27
Bench opinions = 19		Opinions relating to orders = 8		In-chambers opinions = 0
Unanimous opinions: 2		Most joined by: Thomas (16)		Least joined by: Barrett (4)

Type	Case	Citation	Issues	Joined by	Other opinions
	Bovat v. Vermont	592 U.S. ___ (2020)	Fourth Amendment	Sotomayor, Kagan	
Gorsuch filed a statement respecting the Court's denial of certiorari.
	Democratic National Committee v. Wisconsin State Legislature	592 U.S. ___ (2020)		Kavanaugh	Roberts; Kavanaugh; Kagan
Gorsuch concurred in the Court's denial of application to vacate stay.
	Moore v. Circosta	592 U.S. ___ (2020)		Alito	
Gorsuch dissented from the Court's denial of application for injunctive relief.
	Roman Catholic Diocese of Brooklyn v. Cuomo	592 U.S. ___ (2020)			per curiam; Kavanaugh; Roberts; Breyer; Sotomayor
Gorsuch concurred in the Court's grant of application for injunctive relief.
	United States v. Briggs	592 U.S. ___ (2020)			Alito
	Danville Christian Academy, Inc. v. Beshear	592 U.S. ___ (2020)		Alito	Alito
Gorsuch dissented from the Court's denial of application to vacate stay.
	Silver v. United States	592 U.S. ___ (2021)		Thomas	
Gorsuch dissented from the Court's denial of certiorari.
	South Bay United Pentecostal Church v. Newsom	592 U.S. ___ (2021)		Thomas, Alito	Roberts; Barrett; Kagan
Gorsuch filed a statement respecting the Court's partial grant of application for injunctive relief.
	Pereida v. Wilkinson	592 U.S. ___ (2021)		Roberts, Thomas, Alito, Kavanaugh	Breyer
	Torres v. Madrid	592 U.S. ___ (2021)		Thomas, Alito	Roberts
	Ford Motor Co. v. Montana Eighth Judicial Dist.	592 U.S. ___ (2021)		Thomas	Kagan; Alito
	Small v. Memphis Light, Gas & Water	593 U.S. ___ (2021)		Alito	
Gorsuch dissented from the Court's denial of certiorari.
	Niz-Chavez v. Garland	593 U.S. ___ (2021)		Thomas, Breyer, Sotomayor, Kagan, Barrett	Kavanaugh
	BP P.L.C. v. Mayor and City Council of Baltimore	593 U.S. ___ (2021)		Roberts, Thomas, Breyer, Kagan, Kavanaugh, Barrett	Sotomayor
	Edwards v. Vannoy	593 U.S. ___ (2021)		Thomas	Kavanaugh; Thomas; Kagan
	Garland v. Ming Dai	593 U.S. ___ (2021)		Unanimous	
	Fulton v. Philadelphia	593 U.S. ___ (2021)		Thomas, Alito	Roberts; Barrett; Alito
	Nestlé USA, Inc. v. Doe	593 U.S. ___ (2021)		Alito, Kavanaugh (in part)	Thomas; Sotomayor; Alito
	United States v. Arthrex, Inc.	594 U.S. ___ (2021)			Roberts; Breyer; Thomas
	National Collegiate Athletic Assn. v. Alston	594 U.S. ___ (2021)		Unanimous	Kavanaugh
	Goldman Sachs Group, Inc. v. Arkansas Teacher Retirement System	594 U.S. ___ (2021)		Thomas, Alito	Barrett; Sotomayor
	Collins v. Yellen	594 U.S. ___ (2021)			Alito; Thomas; Kagan; Sotomayor
	Yellen v. Confederated Tribes of the Chehalis Reservation	594 U.S. ___ (2021)		Thomas, Kagan	Sotomayor
	HollyFrontier Cheyenne Refining, LLC v. Renewable Fuels Assn.	594 U.S. ___ (2021)		Roberts, Thomas, Breyer, Alito, Kavanaugh	Barrett
	PennEast Pipeline Co. v. New Jersey	594 U.S. ___ (2021)		Thomas	Roberts; Barrett
	Brnovich v. Democratic National Committee	594 U.S. ___ (2021)		Thomas	Alito; Kagan
	Mast v. Fillmore County	594 U.S. ___ (2021)			Alito
Gorsuch concurred in the Court's grant of certiorari, vacatur of the lower court's judgment, and remand for further consideration in light of Fulton v. Philadelphia.
