= 2020 term United States Supreme Court opinions of Samuel Alito =

The 2020 term of the Supreme Court of the United States began October 5, 2020, and concluded October 3, 2021. This was the sixteenth term of Associate Justice Samuel Alito's tenure on the Court.
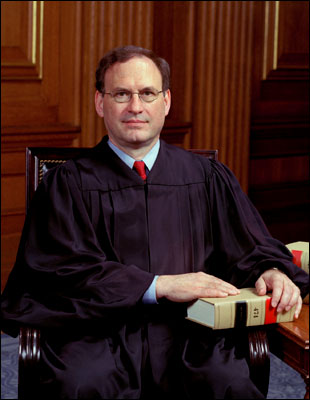

Samuel Alito 2020 term statistics

6	Majority or plurality	8	Concurrence	1	Other
9	Dissent	1	Concurrence/dissent	Total =	25
Bench opinions = 19		Opinions relating to orders = 6		In-chambers opinions = 0
Unanimous opinions: 1		Most joined by: Gorsuch (11 in full, 2 in part)		Least joined by: Breyer, Sotomayor, Kagan, Barrett (4)

Type	Case	Citation	Issues	Joined by	Other opinions
	FDA v. American College of Obstetricians and Gynecologists	592 U.S. ___ (2020)		Thomas	
Alito dissented from the Court's order holding application for stay in abeyance.
	Republican Party of Pennsylvania v. Boockvar	592 U.S. ___ (2020)		Thomas, Gorsuch	
Alito filed a statement respecting the Court's denial of motion to expedite consideration of the petition for a writ of certiorari.
	Taylor v. Riojas	592 U.S. ___ (2020)	Eighth Amendment • conditions of confinement		per curiam
	United States v. Briggs	592 U.S. ___ (2020)		Roberts, Thomas, Breyer, Sotomayor, Kagan, Gorsuch, Kavanaugh	Gorsuch
	Texas v. New Mexico	592 U.S. ___ (2020)			Kavanaugh
	Danville Christian Academy, Inc. v. Beshear	592 U.S. ___ (2020)			Gorsuch
Alito dissented from the Court's denial of application to vacate stay.
	Chicago v. Fulton	592 U.S. ___ (2021)		Roberts, Thomas, Breyer, Sotomayor, Kagan, Gorsuch, Kavanaugh	Sotomayor
	Republican Party of Pennsylvania v. Degraffenreid	592 U.S. ___ (2021)		Gorsuch	Thomas
Alito dissented from the Court's denial of certiorari.
	Ford Motor Co. v. Montana Eighth Judicial Dist.	592 U.S. ___ (2021)			Kagan; Gorsuch
	Facebook, Inc. v. Duguid	592 U.S. ___ (2021)			Sotomayor
	Texas v. California	593 U.S. ___ (2021)		Thomas	
Alito dissented from the Court's denial of motion for leave to file a bill of complaint.
	Caniglia v. Strom	593 U.S. ___ (2021)			Thomas; Roberts; Kavanaugh
	San Antonio v. Hotels.com, L.P.	593 U.S. ___ (2021)		Unanimous	
	United States v. Cooley	593 U.S. ___ (2021)			Breyer
	Fulton v. Philadelphia	593 U.S. ___ (2021)		Thomas, Gorsuch	Roberts; Barrett; Gorsuch
	Nestlé USA, Inc. v. Doe	593 U.S. ___ (2021)			Thomas; Gorsuch; Sotomayor
	California v. Texas	593 U.S. ___ (2021)		Gorsuch	Breyer; Thomas
	Mahanoy Area School Dist. v. B. L.	594 U.S. ___ (2021)		Gorsuch	Breyer; Thomas
	Collins v. Yellen	594 U.S. ___ (2021)		Roberts, Thomas, Kavanaugh, Barrett; Breyer, Sotomayor, Kagan, Gorsuch (in part)	Thomas; Gorsuch; Kagan; Sotomayor
	Lombardo v. St. Louis	594 U.S. ___ (2021)		Thomas, Gorsuch	per curiam
	Johnson v. Guzman Chavez	594 U.S. ___ (2021)		Roberts, Kavanaugh, Barrett; Thomas, Gorsuch (in part)	Thomas; Breyer
	Minerva Surgical, Inc. v. Hologic, Inc.	594 U.S. ___ (2021)			Kagan; Barrett
	Americans for Prosperity Foundation v. Bonta	594 U.S. ___ (2021)		Gorsuch	Roberts; Thomas; Sotomayor
	Brnovich v. Democratic National Committee	594 U.S. ___ (2021)		Roberts, Thomas, Gorsuch, Kavanaugh, Barrett	Gorsuch; Kagan
	Mast v. Fillmore County	594 U.S. ___ (2021)			Gorsuch
Alito concurred in the Court's grant of certiorari, vacatur of the lower court's judgment, and remand for further consideration in light of Fulton v. Philadelphia.
