= 2020 term United States Supreme Court opinions of Brett Kavanaugh =

The 2020 term of the Supreme Court of the United States began October 5, 2020, and concluded October 3, 2021. This was the third term of Associate Justice Brett Kavanaugh's tenure on the Court.
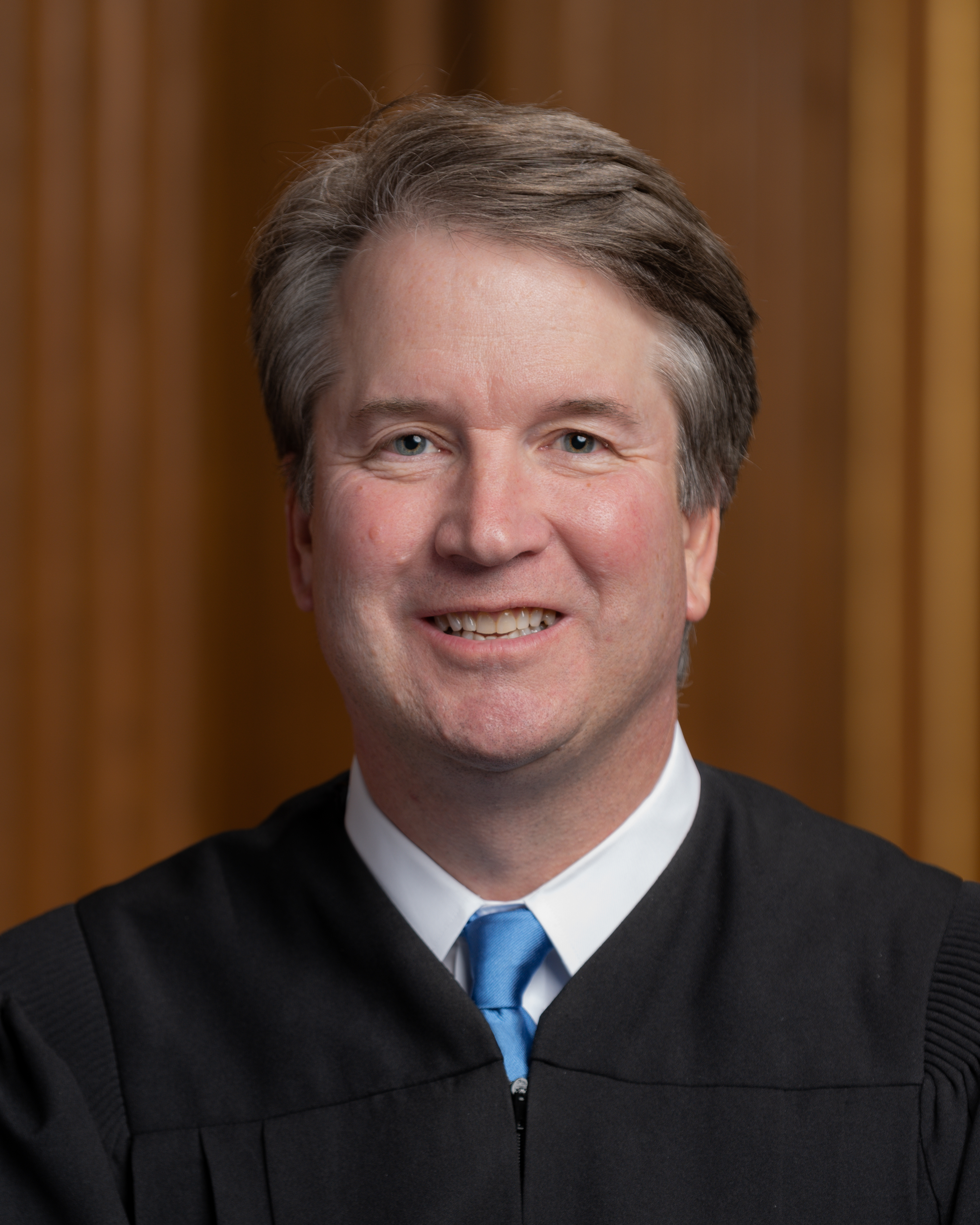

Brett Kavanaugh 2020 term statistics

6	Majority or plurality	11	Concurrence	1	Other
3	Dissent	0	Concurrence/dissent	Total =	21
Bench opinions = 15		Opinions relating to orders = 6		In-chambers opinions = 0
Unanimous opinions: 1		Most joined by: Roberts (9)		Least joined by: Sotomayor (2)

Type	Case	Citation	Issues	Joined by	Other opinions
	Andino v. Middleton	592 U.S. ___ (2020)			
Kavanaugh concurred in the Court's partial grant of application for stay.
	Democratic National Committee v. Wisconsin State Legislature	592 U.S. ___ (2020)			Roberts; Gorsuch; Kagan
Kavanaugh concurred in the Court's denial of application to vacate stay.
	National Football League v. Ninth Inning, Inc.	592 U.S. ___ (2020)	antitrust law • broadcast rights to National Football League games		
Kavanaugh filed a statement respecting the Court's denial of certiorari.
	Roman Catholic Diocese of Brooklyn v. Cuomo	592 U.S. ___ (2020)			per curiam; Gorsuch; Roberts; Breyer; Sotomayor
Kavanaugh concurred in the Court's grant of application for injunctive relief.
	Texas v. New Mexico	592 U.S. ___ (2020)		Roberts, Thomas, Breyer, Sotomayor, Kagan, Gorsuch	Alito
	Dunn v. Smith	592 U.S. ___ (2021)		Roberts	Kagan
Kavanaugh dissented from the Court's denial of application to vacate injunction.
	Uzuegbunam v. Preczewski	592 U.S. ___ (2021)	Article III		Thomas; Roberts
	FCC v. Prometheus Radio Project	592 U.S. ___ (2021)		Unanimous	Thomas
	Jones v. Mississippi	593 U.S. ___ (2021)		Roberts, Alito, Gorsuch, Barrett	Thomas; Sotomayor
	Niz-Chavez v. Garland	593 U.S. ___ (2021)		Roberts, Alito	Gorsuch
	Caniglia v. Strom	593 U.S. ___ (2021)			Thomas; Roberts; Alito
	CIC Servs., LLC v. IRS	593 U.S. ___ (2021)			Kagan; Sotomayor
	Edwards v. Vannoy	593 U.S. ___ (2021)		Roberts, Thomas, Alito, Gorsuch, Barrett	Thomas; Gorsuch; Kagan
	Sanders v. United States	593 U.S. ___ (2021)			
Kavanaugh concurred in the Court's grant of certiorari, vacatur of the lower court's judgment, and remand for further consideration in light of Caniglia v. Strom.
	Borden v. United States	593 U.S. ___ (2021)		Roberts, Alito, Barrett	Kagan; Thomas
	Greer v. United States	593 U.S. ___ (2021)		Roberts, Thomas, Breyer, Alito, Kagan, Gorsuch, Barrett	Sotomayor
	National Collegiate Athletic Assn. v. Alston	594 U.S. ___ (2021)			Gorsuch
	Cedar Point Nursery v. Hassid	594 U.S. ___ (2021)			Roberts; Breyer
	Lange v. California	594 U.S. ___ (2021)			Kagan; Thomas; Roberts
	TransUnion LLC v. Ramirez	594 U.S. ___ (2021)		Roberts, Alito, Gorsuch, Barrett	Thomas; Kagan
	Alabama Assn. of Realtors v. Department of Health and Human Servs.	594 U.S. ___ (2021)			
Kavanaugh concurred in the Court's denial of application to vacate stay.
