= 2020 term United States Supreme Court opinions of Elena Kagan =

The 2020 term of the Supreme Court of the United States began October 5, 2020, and concluded October 3, 2021. This was the eleventh term of Associate Justice Elena Kagan's tenure on the Court.
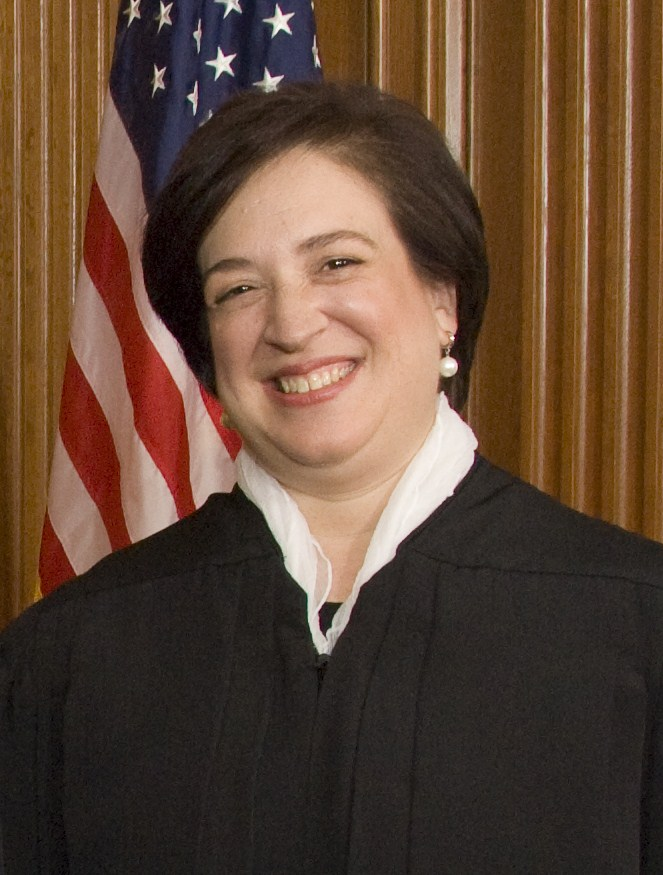

Elena Kagan 2020 term statistics

6	Majority or plurality	3	Concurrence	0	Other
8	Dissent	0	Concurrence/dissent	Total =	17
Bench opinions = 11		Opinions relating to orders = 6		In-chambers opinions = 0
Unanimous opinions: 2		Most joined by: Breyer, Sotomayor (16 in full, 1 in part)		Least joined by: Alito (2)

Type	Case	Citation	Issues	Joined by	Other opinions
	Democratic National Committee v. Wisconsin State Legislature	592 U.S. ___ (2020)		Breyer, Sotomayor	Roberts; Gorsuch; Kavanaugh
Kagan dissented from the Court's denial of application to vacate stay.
	High Plains Harvest Church v. Polis	592 U.S. ___ (2020)		Breyer, Sotomayor	
Kagan dissented from the Court's grant of certiorari before judgment, vacatur of the lower court's decision, and remand for further consideration in light of Roman Catholic Diocese of Brooklyn v. Cuomo.
	South Bay United Pentecostal Church v. Newsom	592 U.S. ___ (2021)		Breyer, Sotomayor	Roberts; Barrett; Gorsuch
Kagan dissented from the Court's partial grant of application for injunctive relief.
	Dunn v. Smith	592 U.S. ___ (2021)		Breyer, Sotomayor, Barrett	Kavanaugh
Kagan concurred in the Court's denial of application to vacate injunction.
	Thompson v. Lumpkin	592 U.S. ___ (2021)		Breyer, Sotomayor	
Kagan concurred in the Court's denial of certiorari.
	Ford Motor Co. v. Montana Eighth Judicial Dist.	592 U.S. ___ (2021)		Roberts, Breyer, Sotomayor, Kavanaugh	Alito; Gorsuch
	Tandon v. Newsom	593 U.S. ___ (2021)		Breyer, Sotomayor	per curiam
Kagan dissented from the Court's grant of application for injunctive relief.
	CIC Servs., LLC v. IRS	593 U.S. ___ (2021)		Unanimous	Sotomayor; Kavanaugh
	Edwards v. Vannoy	593 U.S. ___ (2021)		Breyer, Sotomayor	Kavanaugh; Thomas
	Sanchez v. Mayorkas	593 U.S. ___ (2021)		Unanimous	
	Borden v. United States	593 U.S. ___ (2021)		Breyer, Sotomayor, Gorsuch	Thomas; Kavanaugh
	Collins v. Yellen	594 U.S. ___ (2021)		Breyer, Sotomayor (in part)	Alito; Thomas; Gorsuch; Sotomayor
	Lange v. California	594 U.S. ___ (2021)		Breyer, Sotomayor, Gorsuch, Kavanaugh, Barrett; Thomas (in part)	Kavanaugh; Thomas; Roberts
	TransUnion LLC v. Ramirez	594 U.S. ___ (2021)		Breyer, Sotomayor	Kavanaugh; Thomas
	Minerva Surgical, Inc. v. Hologic, Inc.	594 U.S. ___ (2021)		Roberts, Breyer, Sotomayor, Kavanaugh	Alito; Barrett
	Brnovich v. Democratic National Committee	594 U.S. ___ (2021)		Breyer, Sotomayor	Alito; Gorsuch
	Whole Woman's Health v. Jackson	594 U.S. ___ (2021)		Breyer, Sotomayor	Roberts; Breyer; Sotomayor
Kagan dissented from the Court's denial of application for injunctive relief.
