= 2020 term United States Supreme Court opinions of Clarence Thomas =

The 2020 term of the Supreme Court of the United States began October 5, 2020, and concluded October 3, 2021. This was the thirtieth term of Associate Justice Clarence Thomas's tenure on the Court.
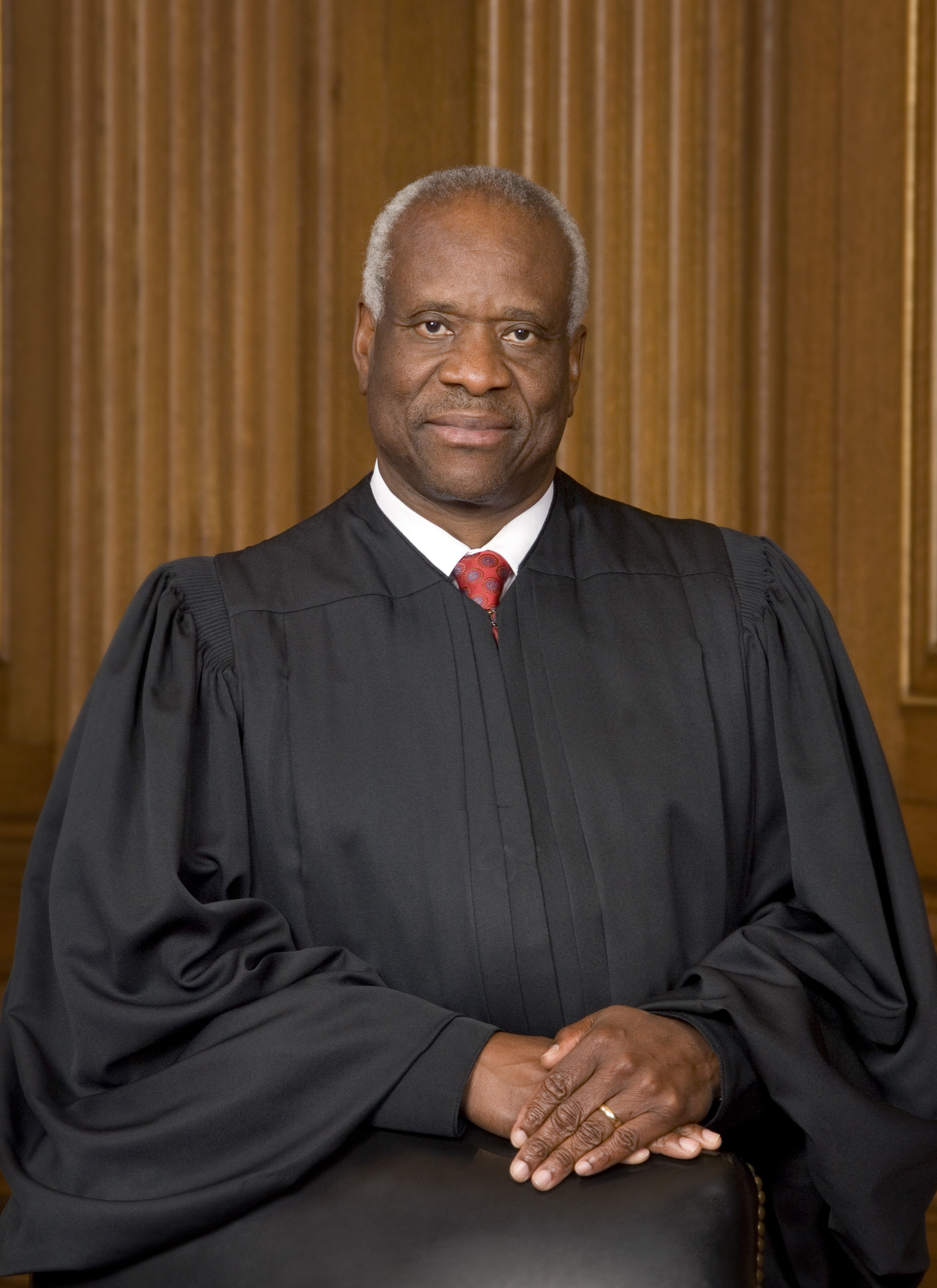

Clarence Thomas 2020 term statistics

7	Majority or plurality	13	Concurrence	5	Other
11	Dissent	0	Concurrence/dissent	Total =	36
Bench opinions = 24		Opinions relating to orders = 12		In-chambers opinions = 0
Unanimous opinions: 3		Most joined by: Gorsuch (12)		Least joined by: Roberts (6 in full, 1 in part)

Type	Case	Citation	Issues	Joined by	Other opinions
	Davis v. Ermold	592 U.S. ___ (2020)		Alito	
Thomas filed a statement respecting the Court's denial of certiorari.
	Malwarebytes, Inc. v. Enigma Software Group USA, LLC	592 U.S. ___ (2020)			
Thomas filed a statement respecting the Court's denial of certiorari.
	Rogers County Board of Tax Roll Corrections v. Video Gaming Technologies, Inc.	592 U.S. ___ (2020)			
Thomas dissented from the Court's denial of certiorari.
	Tanzin v. Tanvir	592 U.S. ___ (2020)		Roberts, Breyer, Alito, Sotomayor, Kagan, Gorsuch, Kavanaugh	
	Rutledge v. Pharmaceutical Care Management Assn.	592 U.S. ___ (2020)			Sotomayor
	Bruni v. City of Pittsburgh	592 U.S. ___ (2021)			
Thomas filed a statement respecting the Court's denial of certiorari.
	Salinas v. Railroad Retirement Bd.	592 U.S. ___ (2021)		Alito, Gorsuch, Barrett	Sotomayor
	Bridge Aina Le’a, LLC v. Hawaii Land Use Commission	592 U.S. ___ (2021)	Fifth Amendment • Takings Clause • regulatory takings		
Thomas dissented from the Court's denial of certiorari.
	Republican Party of Pennsylvania v. Degraffenreid	592 U.S. ___ (2021)			Alito
Thomas dissented from the Court's denial of certiorari.
	Brownback v. King	592 U.S. ___ (2021)	Federal Tort Claims Act	Unanimous	Sotomayor
	Uzuegbunam v. Preczewski	592 U.S. ___ (2021)	Article III	Breyer, Alito, Sotomayor, Kagan, Gorsuch, Kavanaugh, Barrett	Kavanaugh; Roberts
	FCC v. Prometheus Radio Project	592 U.S. ___ (2021)			Kavanaugh
	Google LLC v. Oracle America, Inc.	593 U.S. ___ (2021)		Alito	Breyer
	Biden v. Knight First Amendment Institute at Columbia University	593 U.S. ___ (2021)			
Thomas concurred in the Court's grant of certiorari, vacatur, and remand for dismissal as moot.
	Carr v. Saul	593 U.S. ___ (2021)		Gorsuch, Barrett	Sotomayor; Breyer
	Jones v. Mississippi	593 U.S. ___ (2021)			Kavanaugh; Sotomayor
	Doe v. United States	593 U.S. ___ (2021)			
Thomas dissented from the Court's denial of certiorari.
	Caniglia v. Strom	593 U.S. ___ (2021)		Unanimous	Roberts; Alito; Kavanaugh
	Edwards v. Vannoy	593 U.S. ___ (2021)		Gorsuch	Kavanaugh; Gorsuch; Kagan
	Guam v. United States	593 U.S. ___ (2021)		Unanimous	
	Van Buren v. United States	593 U.S. ___ (2021)		Roberts, Alito	Barrett
	Borden v. United States	593 U.S. ___ (2021)			Kagan; Kavanaugh
	Terry v. United States	593 U.S. ___ (2021)		Roberts, Breyer, Alito, Kagan, Gorsuch, Kavanaugh, Barrett; Sotomayor (in part)	Sotomayor
	Nestlé USA, Inc. v. Doe	593 U.S. ___ (2021)		Gorsuch, Kavanaugh; Roberts, Breyer, Sotomayor, Kagan, Barrett (in part)	Gorsuch; Sotomayor; Alito
	California v. Texas	593 U.S. ___ (2021)			Breyer; Alito
	United States v. Arthrex, Inc.	594 U.S. ___ (2021)		Breyer, Sotomayor, Kagan (in part)	Roberts; Gorsuch; Breyer
	Mahanoy Area School Dist. v. B. L.	594 U.S. ___ (2021)			Breyer; Alito
	Collins v. Yellen	594 U.S. ___ (2021)			Alito; Gorsuch; Kagan; Sotomayor
	Lange v. California	594 U.S. ___ (2021)		Kavanaugh (in part)	Kagan; Kavanaugh; Roberts
	TransUnion LLC v. Ramirez	594 U.S. ___ (2021)		Breyer, Sotomayor, Kagan	Kavanaugh; Kagan
	Standing Akimbo, LLC v. United States	594 U.S. ___ (2021)			
Thomas filed a statement respecting the Court's denial of certiorari.
	Johnson v. Guzman Chavez	594 U.S. ___ (2021)		Gorsuch	Alito; Breyer
	Americans for Prosperity Foundation v. Bonta	594 U.S. ___ (2021)			Roberts; Alito; Sotomayor
	Berisha v. Lawson	594 U.S. ___ (2021)			Gorsuch
Thomas dissented from the Court's denial of certiorari.
	Hoggard v. Rhodes	594 U.S. ___ (2021)			
Thomas filed a statement respecting the Court's denial of certiorari.
	Eychaner v. Chicago	594 U.S. ___ (2021)		Gorsuch	
Thomas dissented from the Court's denial of certiorari.
