= 2020 term United States Supreme Court opinions of John Roberts =

The 2020 term of the Supreme Court of the United States began October 5, 2020, and concluded October 3, 2021. This was the sixteenth term of Chief Justice John Roberts's tenure on the Court.
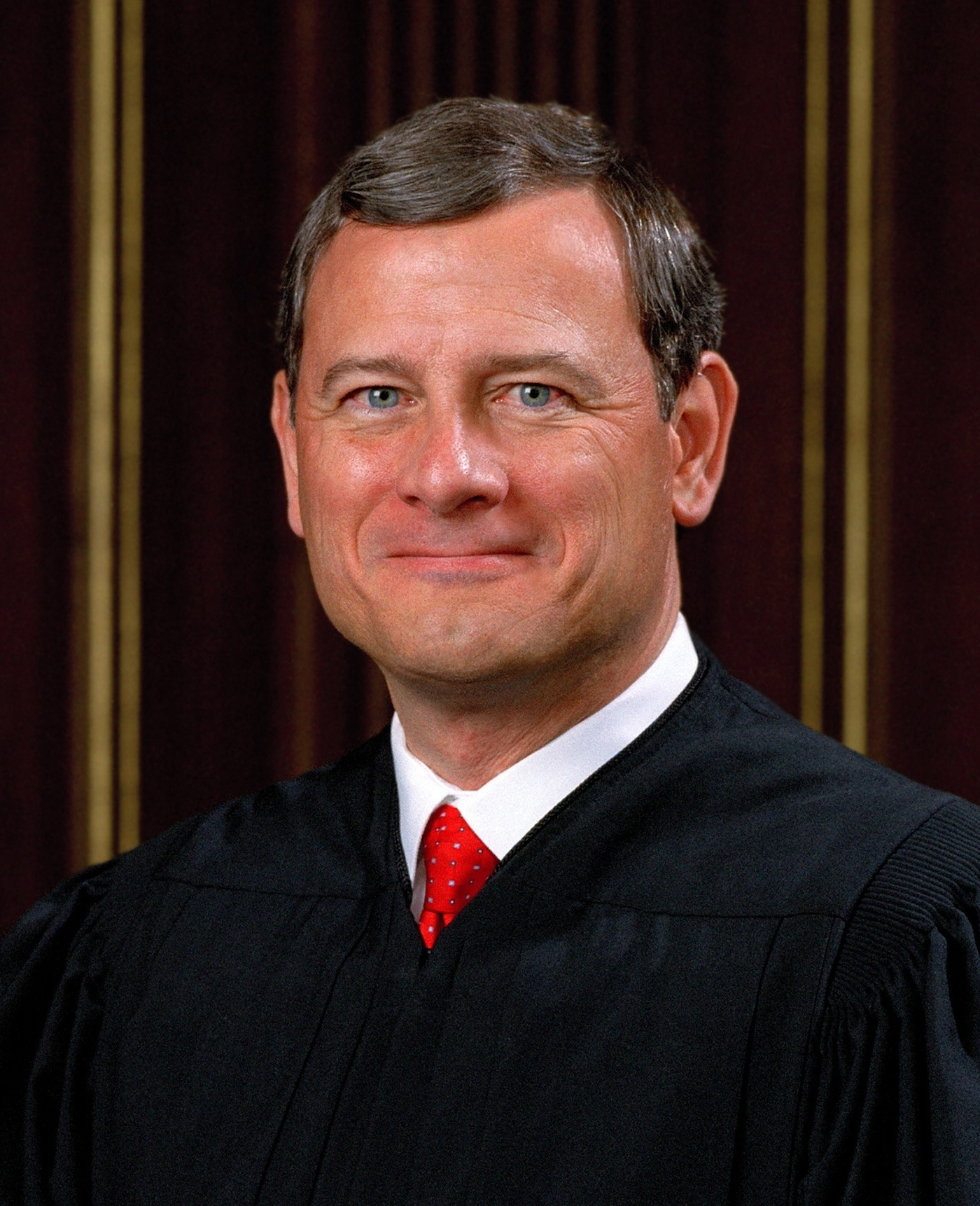

John Roberts 2020 term statistics

7	Majority or plurality	5	Concurrence	1	Other
3	Dissent	0	Concurrence/dissent	Total =	16
Bench opinions = 11		Opinions relating to orders = 5		In-chambers opinions = 0
Unanimous opinions: 1		Most joined by: Kavanaugh (7)		Least joined by: Thomas (2 in full, 1 in part)

Type	Case	Citation	Issues	Joined by	Other opinions
	Democratic National Committee v. Wisconsin State Legislature	592 U.S. ___ (2020)			Gorsuch; Kavanaugh; Kagan
Roberts concurred in the Court's denial of application to vacate stay.
	Roman Catholic Diocese of Brooklyn v. Cuomo	592 U.S. ___ (2020)			per curiam; Gorsuch; Kavanaugh; Breyer; Sotomayor
Roberts dissented from the Court's grant of application for injunctive relief.
	FDA v. American College of Obstetricians and Gynecologists	592 U.S. ___ (2021)			Sotomayor
Roberts concurred in the Court's grant of application for stay.
	Federal Republic of Germany v. Philipp	592 U.S. ___ (2021)		Unanimous	
	South Bay United Pentecostal Church v. Newsom	592 U.S. ___ (2021)			Barrett; Gorsuch; Kagan
Roberts concurred in the Court's partial grant of application for injunctive relief.
	Uzuegbunam v. Preczewski	592 U.S. ___ (2021)	Article III		Thomas; Kavanaugh
	Massachusetts Lobstermen's Assn. v. Raimondo	592 U.S. ___ (2021)			
Roberts filed a statement respecting the Court's denial of certiorari.
	Torres v. Madrid	592 U.S. ___ (2021)		Breyer, Sotomayor, Kagan, Kavanaugh	Gorsuch
	Caniglia v. Strom	593 U.S. ___ (2021)		Breyer	Thomas; Alito; Kavanaugh
	Fulton v. Philadelphia	593 U.S. ___ (2021)		Breyer, Sotomayor, Kagan, Kavanaugh, Barrett	Barrett; Alito; Gorsuch
	United States v. Arthrex, Inc.	594 U.S. ___ (2021)		Alito, Kavanaugh, Barrett; Gorsuch (in part)	Gorsuch; Breyer; Thomas
	Cedar Point Nursery v. Hassid	594 U.S. ___ (2021)		Thomas, Alito, Gorsuch, Kavanaugh, Barrett	Kavanaugh; Breyer
	Lange v. California	594 U.S. ___ (2021)		Alito	Kagan; Kavanaugh; Thomas
	PennEast Pipeline Co. v. New Jersey	594 U.S. ___ (2021)		Breyer, Alito, Sotomayor, Kavanaugh	Gorsuch; Barrett
	Americans for Prosperity Foundation v. Bonta	594 U.S. ___ (2021)		Kavanaugh, Barrett; Thomas, Alito, Gorsuch (in part)	Thomas; Alito; Sotomayor
	Whole Woman's Health v. Jackson	594 U.S. ___ (2021)		Breyer, Kagan	Breyer; Sotomayor; Kagan
Roberts dissented from the Court's denial of application for injunctive relief.
