= 2020 term United States Supreme Court opinions of Stephen Breyer =

The 2020 term of the Supreme Court of the United States began October 5, 2020, and concluded October 3, 2021. This was the twenty-seventh term of Associate Justice Stephen Breyer's tenure on the Court.
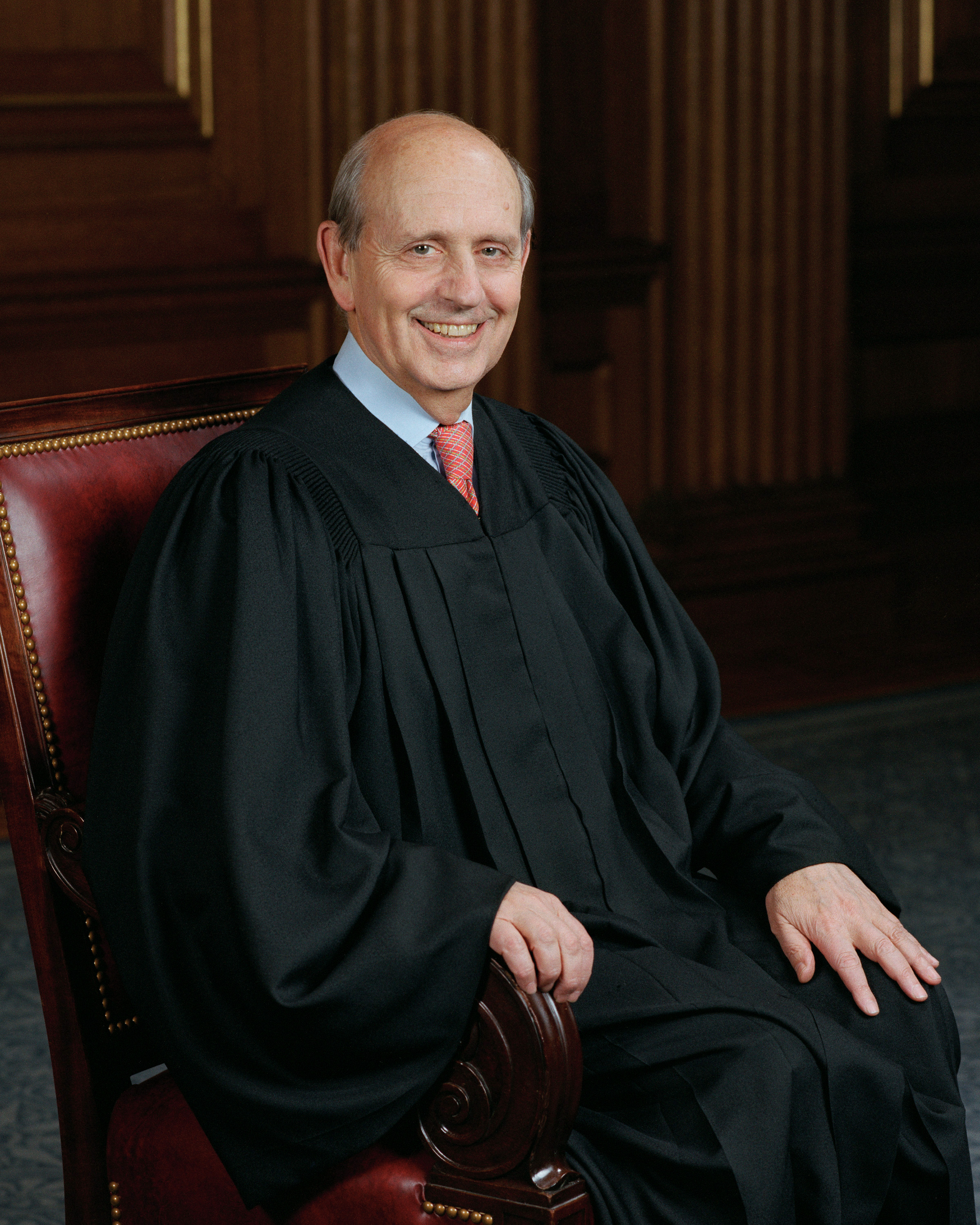

Stephen Breyer 2020 term statistics

6	Majority or plurality	1	Concurrence	0	Other
11	Dissent	1	Concurrence/dissent	Total =	19
Bench opinions = 15		Opinions relating to orders = 4		In-chambers opinions = 0
Unanimous opinions: 2		Most joined by: Sotomayor (16)		Least joined by: Thomas, Alito, Barrett (4)

Type	Case	Citation	Issues	Joined by	Other opinions
	Roman Catholic Diocese of Brooklyn v. Cuomo	592 U.S. ___ (2020)		Sotomayor, Kagan	per curiam; Gorsuch; Kavanaugh; Roberts; Sotomayor
Breyer dissented from the Court's grant of application for injunctive relief.
	Carney v. Adams	592 U.S. ___ (2020)		Roberts, Thomas, Alito, Sotomayor, Kagan, Gorsuch, Kavanaugh	Sotomayor
	Trump v. New York	592 U.S. ___ (2020)		Sotomayor, Kagan	per curiam
	United States v. Higgs	592 U.S. ___ (2021)			Sotomayor
Breyer dissented from the Court's grant of certiorari before judgment and summary reversal, and application to vacate stay of execution.
	Pereida v. Wilkinson	592 U.S. ___ (2021)		Sotomayor, Kagan	Gorsuch
	United States Fish and Wildlife Serv. v. Sierra Club, Inc.	592 U.S. ___ (2021)		Sotomayor	Barrett
	Google LLC v. Oracle America, Inc.	593 U.S. ___ (2021)		Roberts, Sotomayor, Kagan, Gorsuch, Kavanaugh	Thomas
	AMG Capital Management, LLC v. FTC	593 U.S. ___ (2021)		Unanimous	
	Carr v. Saul	593 U.S. ___ (2021)			Sotomayor; Thomas
	Johnson v. Precythe	593 U.S. ___ (2021)			Sotomayor
Breyer dissented from the Court's denial of certiorari.
	United States v. Cooley	593 U.S. ___ (2021)		Unanimous	Alito
	California v. Texas	593 U.S. ___ (2021)		Roberts, Thomas, Sotomayor, Kagan, Kavanaugh, Barrett	Thomas; Alito
	United States v. Arthrex, Inc.	594 U.S. ___ (2021)		Sotomayor, Kagan	Roberts; Gorsuch; Thomas
	Cedar Point Nursery v. Hassid	594 U.S. ___ (2021)		Sotomayor, Kagan	Roberts; Kavanaugh
	Mahanoy Area School Dist. v. B. L.	594 U.S. ___ (2021)		Roberts, Alito, Sotomayor, Kagan, Gorsuch, Kavanaugh, Barrett	Alito; Thomas
	Johnson v. Guzman Chavez	594 U.S. ___ (2021)		Sotomayor, Kagan	Alito; Thomas
	Chrysafis v. Marks	594 U.S. ___ (2021)		Sotomayor, Kagan	
Breyer dissented from the Court's grant of application for injunctive relief.
	Alabama Assn. of Realtors v. Department of Health and Human Servs.	594 U.S. ___ (2021)		Sotomayor, Kagan	per curiam
Breyer dissented from the Court's grant of application to vacate stay.
	Whole Woman's Health v. Jackson	594 U.S. ___ (2021)		Sotomayor, Kagan	Roberts; Sotomayor; Kagan
Breyer dissented from the Court's denial of application for injunctive relief.
