= 2020 term United States Supreme Court opinions of Amy Coney Barrett =

The 2020 term of the Supreme Court of the United States began October 5, 2020, and concluded October 3, 2021. This was the first term of Associate Justice Amy Coney Barrett's tenure on the Court.
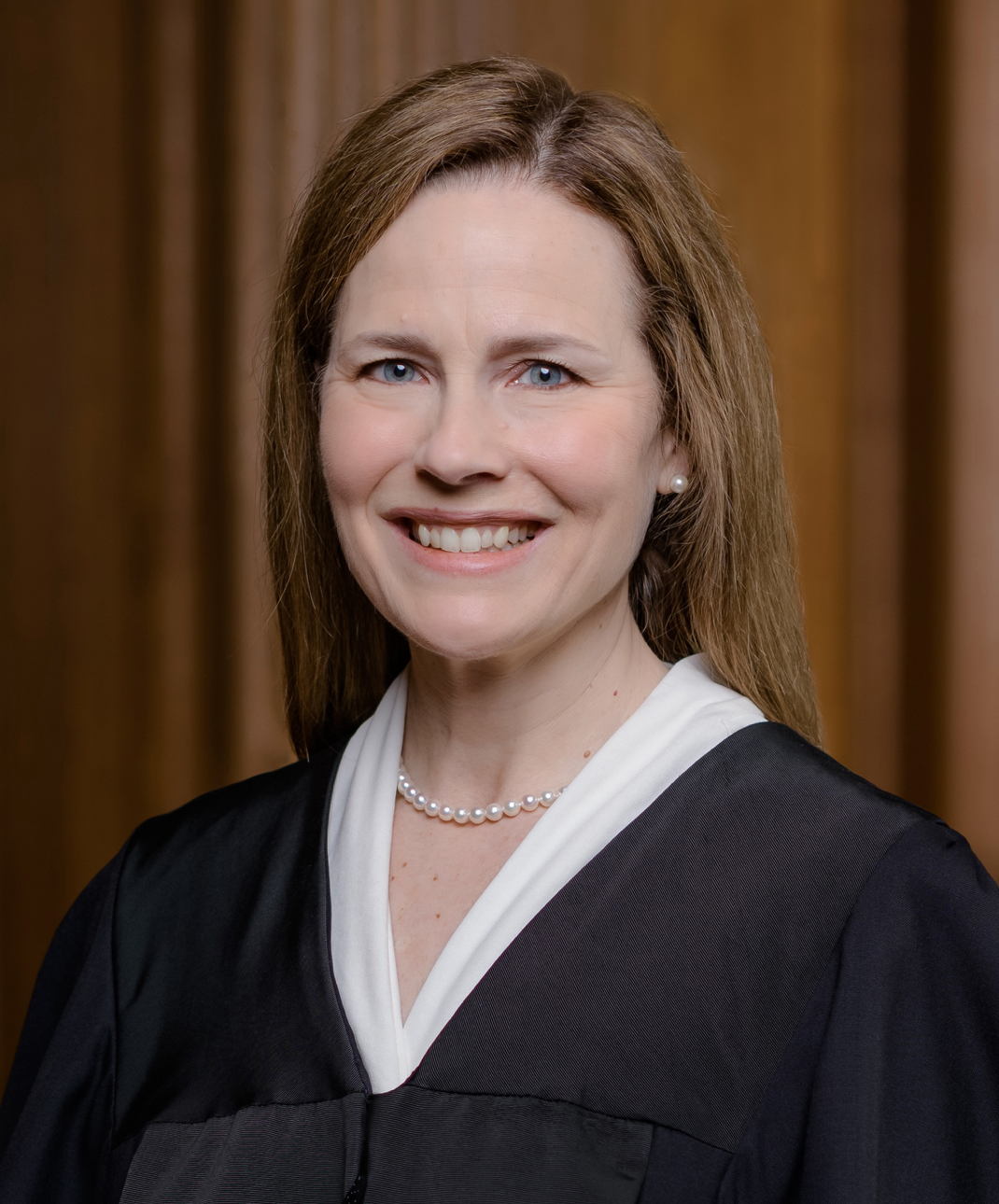

Amy Coney Barrett 2020 term statistics

4	Majority or plurality	2	Concurrence	0	Other
3	Dissent	0	Concurrence/dissent	Total =	9
Bench opinions = 8		Opinions relating to orders = 1		In-chambers opinions = 0
Unanimous opinions: 1		Most joined by: Kagan, Kavanaugh (6)		Least joined by: Alito (2 in full, 1 in part)

Type	Case	Citation	Issues	Joined by	Other opinions
	South Bay United Pentecostal Church v. Newsom	592 U.S. ___ (2021)		Kavanaugh	Roberts; Gorsuch; Kagan
Barrett concurred in the Court's partial grant of application for injunctive relief.
	United States Fish and Wildlife Serv. v. Sierra Club, Inc.	592 U.S. ___ (2021)		Roberts, Thomas, Alito, Kagan, Gorsuch, Kavanaugh	Breyer
	Florida v. Georgia	592 U.S. ___ (2021)		Unanimous	
	Van Buren v. United States	593 U.S. ___ (2021)		Breyer, Sotomayor, Kagan, Gorsuch, Kavanaugh	Thomas
	Fulton v. Philadelphia	593 U.S. ___ (2021)		Kavanaugh; Breyer (in part)	Roberts; Alito; Gorsuch
	Goldman Sachs Group, Inc. v. Arkansas Teacher Retirement System	594 U.S. ___ (2021)		Roberts, Breyer, Kagan, Kavanaugh; Thomas, Alito, Sotomayor, Gorsuch (in part)	Sotomayor; Gorsuch
	HollyFrontier Cheyenne Refining, LLC v. Renewable Fuels Assn.	594 U.S. ___ (2021)		Sotomayor, Kagan	Gorsuch
	PennEast Pipeline Co. v. New Jersey	594 U.S. ___ (2021)		Thomas, Kagan, Gorsuch	Roberts; Gorsuch
	Minerva Surgical, Inc. v. Hologic, Inc.	594 U.S. ___ (2021)		Thomas, Gorsuch	Kagan; Alito
