= Tandon v. Newsom =

- Supreme Court of the United States

Decided April 9, 2021
- Full case name: Ritesh Tandon, et al. v. Gavin Newsom, Governor of California, et al.
- Docket no.: 20A151
- Citations: 593 U.S. 61 (more) 141 S. Ct. 1294

Case history
- Prior: Preliminary injunction denied, 517 F.Supp.3d 922 (N.D. Cal. 2021). Injunction pending appeal denied, 992 F.3d 916 (9th Cir. 2021).

Holding
- Government regulations are not neutral and generally applicable, and therefore trigger strict scrutiny under the Free Exercise Clause, whenever they treat any comparable secular activity more favorably than religious exercise.

Court membership
- Chief Justice John Roberts Associate Justices Clarence Thomas · Stephen Breyer; Samuel Alito · Sonia Sotomayor; Elena Kagan · Neil Gorsuch; Brett Kavanaugh · Amy Coney Barrett

Case opinions
- Per curiam
- Dissent: Roberts (without opinion)
- Dissent: Kagan, joined by Breyer, Sotomayor

Laws applied
- Free Exercise Clause of the First Amendment

Tandon v. Newsom, 593 U.S. 61 (2021), was the last major decision of the U.S. Supreme Court addressing religious-liberty challenges to restrictions on public gatherings during the COVID-19 pandemic. The decision significantly transformed existing religious-liberty doctrine by adopting the "most favored nation" approach, holding that "government regulations are not neutral and generally applicable, and therefore trigger strict scrutiny under the Free Exercise Clause, whenever they treat any comparable secular activity more favorably than religious exercise."

During the COVID-19 pandemic, the government of California limited all gatherings inside homes to three households, regardless of the purpose of meeting. However, there were no household limits on some secular activities outside homes, including personal care providers. Before the pandemic, plaintiffs Jeremy Wong and Karen Busch held Bible studies in their homes, but they were restricted from continuing by California's limit on in-home gatherings. They sued California officials, alleging that their First Amendment rights to religious activities were being violated.

Before Tandon, the Supreme Court held in Employment Division v. Smith (1990) that laws which are "neutral" and "generally applicable" need not satisfy strict scrutiny to be constitutional. The Tandon court held that the exemptions for some businesses outside the home made the regulation not neutral and generally applicable. Finding it likely that California's restriction would not withstand strict scrutiny, the Supreme Court issued an injunction prohibiting California from applying the restriction to in-home religious gatherings pending appeal.

Called the "most important free exercise decision since 1990", the case was seen as a significant narrowing of Smith. Legal scholar Steve Vladeck argued that it was significant the court chose to use the shadow docket to issue this major decision, as opposed to the more time-consuming merits docket.

== Factual background ==
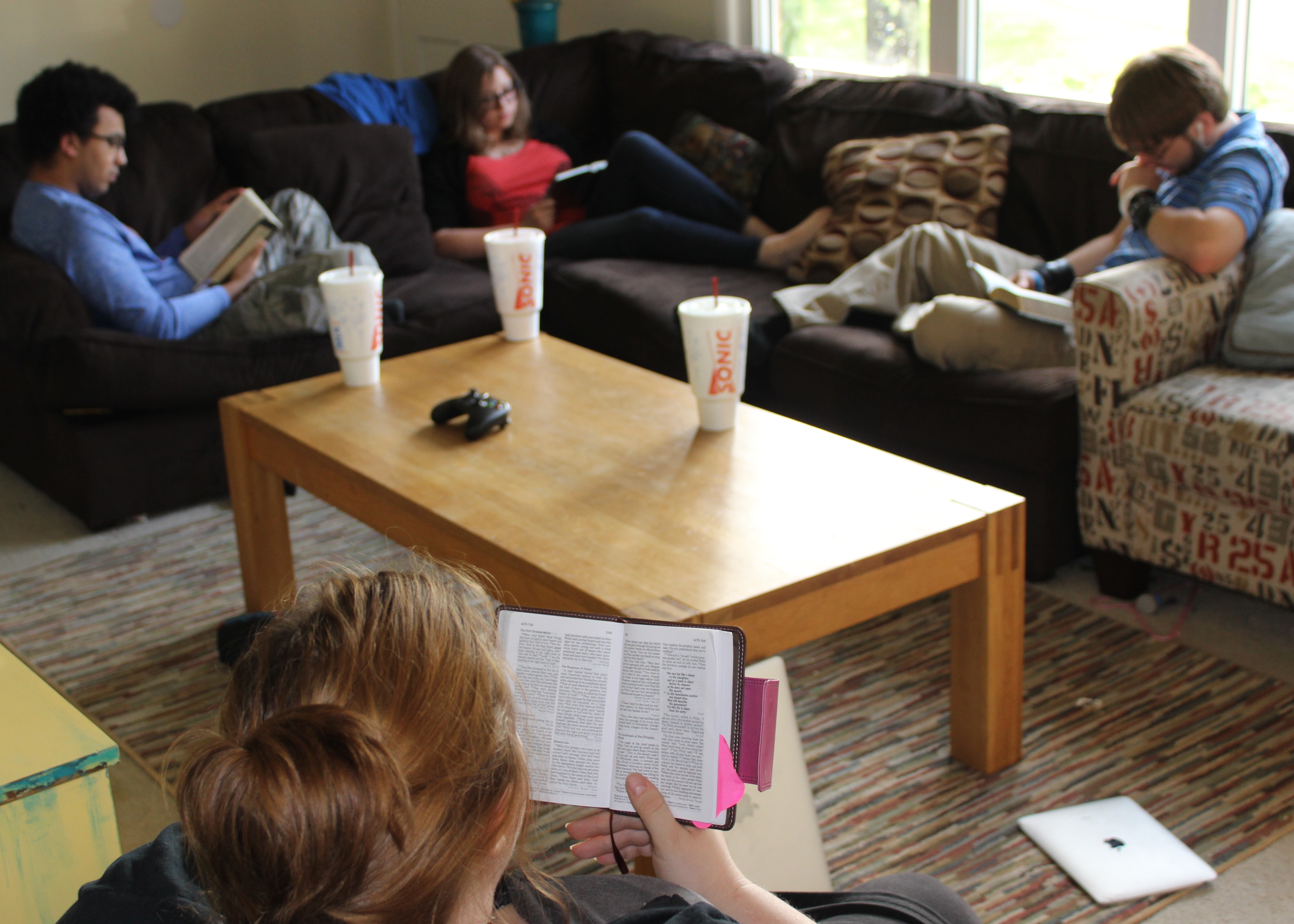
Bible study group in 2015. Under the challenged restriction, no more than three households could gather in a home.

During the COVID-19 pandemic, California responded with various measures designed to limit transmission of the disease. On August 28, 2020, Governor Gavin Newsom published the state's plan for gradual reopening, titled the Blueprint for a Safer Economy, which establishing a four-tiered approach to restrictions, tightening as the spread of COVID increased; the highest tier was labelled "widespread". These restrictions included a limit of three households at some indoor activities; outdoor activities faced no such restriction. Indoor locations exempt from the three household limit included "public transportation; establishments that provide personal care, like salons; government offices; movie studios; tattoo parlors; and other commercial spaces". However, all gatherings inside the home – religious and secular – were subject to the limit.

== Legal background ==
=== Public health measures in a pandemic ===
At the beginning of the COVID-19 pandemic, the Supreme Court had last addressed the issue of government power during a pandemic in Jacobson v. Massachusetts (1905). Jacobson was most often taken to mean that the government has broad leeway to restrain individual rights during a pandemic for public safety. However, Jacobson predated tiered scrutiny, under which an infringement of a fundamental right is subject to strict scrutiny, whereas more commonplace restrictions on individual liberty receive only rational basis review, leaving disagreement about whether Jacobson reflected current law.

=== Free exercise of religion ===
Before the COVID-19 cases, the primary framework of free-exercise doctrine was set out by a pair of decisions in the 1990s: Employment Division v. Smith (1990) and Church of Lukumi Babalu Aye v. City of Hialeah (1993). Until Smith, the denial of a religious exemption had been subject to strict scrutiny whenever a law substantially burdened free exercise of religion. Smith made it much harder to seek a religious exemption in federal court by holding that no exemption is required so long as a law is "neutral" and "generally applicable". Lukumi exemplified the flipside – a law that was not neutral toward religion, and therefore was still subject to strict scrutiny. In that case, the court unanimously held that a city ordinance banning animal sacrifice unconstitutionally discriminated against religion because the city made exceptions for many secular purposes, such as killing animals for consumption (food and clothing), sport (hunting and fishing), and euthanasia.

Two strands of pushback to Smith have taken place since the decision. First, critics of Smith have tried to overturn the decision and restore the earlier strict-scrutiny regime. Congress codified the pre-Smith standard with the bipartisan Religious Freedom Restoration Act of 1993, which passed in the Senate by a vote of 97–3. However, the Supreme Court partially struck the law down in City of Boerne v. Flores (1997), holding that Congress could not require state and local governments to give religious exemptions under the pre-Smith strict-scrutiny approach.

Second, some have interpreted Smith narrowly by taking even a single secular exemption as making a law not "generally applicable" such that the denial of a religious exemption would be discriminatory. One prominent example was Fraternal Order of Police, Newark Lodge No. 12 v. City of Newark (3d Cir. 1999), a decision written by Samuel Alito before he joined the Supreme Court, which held that two Muslim police officers could not be required to shave their beards as part of an officer uniform policy because there was an exception for medical reasons (namely, for pseudofolliculitis barbae). This view, known as the "most favored nation" approach, was ultimately adopted by a majority of the court in Tandon.

=== Previous COVID-19 decisions ===
During the COVID-19 pandemic, the Supreme Court of the United States considered a series of shadow docket cases involving Free Exercise Clause challenges to restrictions imposed by state governments on in-person gatherings for religious purposes. The four main previous decisions were:

1. South Bay United Pentecostal Church v. Newsom I (2020)
2. Calvary Chapel Dayton Valley v. Sisolak (2020)
3. Roman Catholic Diocese of Brooklyn v. Cuomo (2020)
4. South Bay United Pentecostal Church v. Newsom II (2021)

Initially, a narrow majority denied these requests, starting with South Bay I in May 2020. However, after the appointment of Amy Coney Barrett to the court, a majority began granting requested injunctions, starting with Roman Catholic Diocese of Brooklyn v. Cuomo in November 2020.

Justice Kavanaugh previously urged the court to adopt the most-favored-nation approach (that when any secular activities receive exemptions, religious activities must generally get those same exemptions, unless sufficient justification can be given for withholding it) in a dissent in Calvary Chapel and later a concurrence in Diocese of Brooklyn.

== Lower courts ==
=== District Court ===
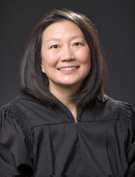
Lucy H. Koh (2019) heard the case in the district court

The case was filed on October 13, 2020, in the United States District Court for the Northern District of California by three groups of business, free speech, and religious freedom plaintiffs. The plaintiffs making a religious freedom challenge were Jeremy Wong and Karen Busch. Before the pandemic, they had held Bible studies at their home for eight to twelve people at a time. They claimed that the restriction on in-home gatherings abridged their rights under the Free Exercise Clause and sought to be allowed to hold "Bible studies, theological discussions, collective prayer, and musical prayer at their homes". Judge Lucy H. Koh held a hearing by video conference over Zoom on December 18, 2020, and rejected the requested preliminary injunction on February 5, 2021.

=== Court of Appeals ===
On March 4, the plaintiffs asked the United States Court of Appeals for the Ninth Circuit for an injunction pending appeal. The motion was heard by a panel of Judges Milan D. Smith, Jr., Bridget S. Bade, and Patrick J. Bumatay. The panel denied the injunction by a 2–1 vote on March 30, 2021.

The majority opinion held that the restrictions were neutral and generally applicable compared to secular activities in the home; and said "that appellants were 'making the wrong comparison because the record does not support that private religious gatherings in homes are comparable—in terms of risk to public health or reasonable safety measures to address that risk—to commercial activities, or even to religious activities, in public buildings.'" Therefore, the restrictions were subject to rational basis review.

The appeals court said:

[T]he district court found that the State reasonably concluded that when people gather in social settings, their interactions are likely to be longer than they would be in a commercial setting; that participants in a social gathering are more likely to be involved in prolonged conversations; that private houses are typically smaller and less ventilated than commercial establishments; and that social distancing and mask-wearing are less likely in private settings and enforcement is more difficult.

==== Dissent ====
Judge Bumatay wrote a dissent, in which he stated three ideas. First, citing Roman Catholic Diocese of Brooklyn v. Cuomo and Justice Kavanaugh's concurrence in Calvary Chapel Dayton Valley v. Sisolak, Bumatay argued that those precedents required using the most-favored nation approach, treating religious exercise at least as favorably as any secular activity to avoid strict scrutiny. Second, a regulation that does not mention religion at all is not necessarily neutral and generally applicable. Finally, in the context of the pandemic, businesses were comparable to religious exercise. Taking these principles together, strict scrutiny should apply to the restrictions.

== Supreme Court ==
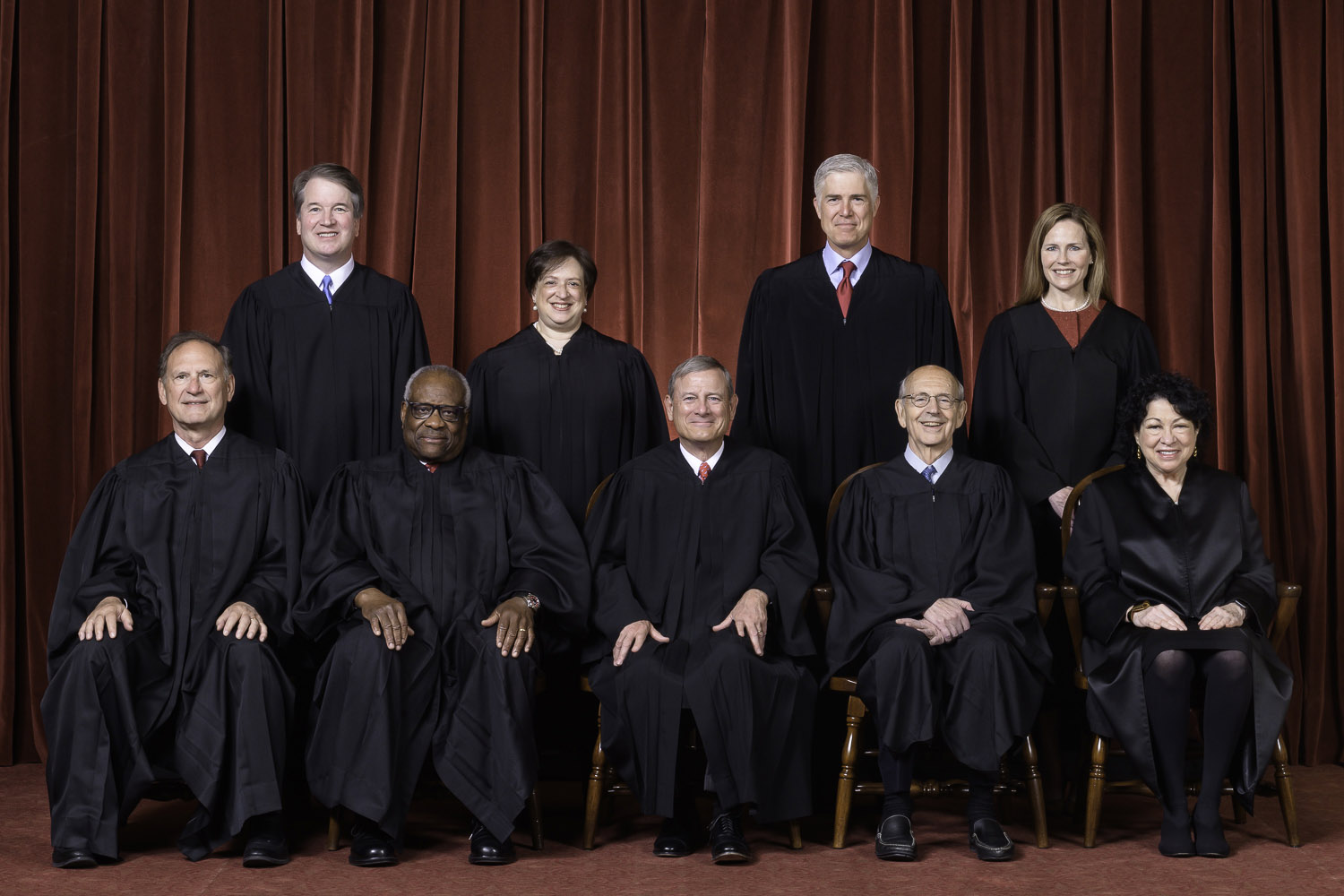
The Supreme Court in April 2021. The order of the court was issued without a noted author. Elena Kagan authored a dissenting opinion, joined by Stephen Breyer and Sonia Sotomayor. Chief Justice John Roberts dissented without a written opinion. Back row: Kavanaugh, Kagan, Gorsuch, Barrett. Front row: Alito, Thomas, Roberts, Breyer, Sotomayor.

The plaintiffs sought an injunction from the Supreme Court on April 2; later that day, California stated that, effective April 15, the restrictions on in-home religious activities would be lifted. Elena Kagan, who was assigned to hear emergency appeals from cases in the Ninth Circuit, gave California until April 8 to respond. California filed its response on the last day, and the plaintiffs in turn filed a reply the next day around 3:00 p.m. Eastern Daylight Time (noon in California).

The court issued its opinion later that day, April 9, shortly before midnight EDT. In a 5–4 per curiam decision on the shadow docket, the Supreme Court disagreed with the Ninth Circuit and granted a preliminary injunction. The decision of the court was divided into four main points.

First, the court adopted the most-favored nation approach, holding that the government must face strict scrutiny whenever it treats any comparable secular activity more favorably than religious activity – even if there are also comparable secular activities that it treats less favorably.

Second, the court said that the comparability of a religious gathering and a secular gathering must not involve a comparison of the reasons for each, but rather only a comparison of their risks. Because indoor activities outside the home were not subject to a three-household limit, this was enough to subject the regulation to strict scrutiny.

Third, to meet the burden of strict scrutiny, California would need to demonstrate that no lesser restrictions on religious activity could address the government's interest in reducing the spread of COVID-19, not merely that some risk factors are "always present in worship, or always absent from the other secular activities". California did not meet that burden.

And fourth, even though California was planning to withdraw the restrictions, the case was not moot. California could reimpose restrictions at any time, and had previously done so.

For those reasons, the court concluded that the petitioners were entitled to an injunction, applying the normal test for a preliminary injunction from a district court – saying that the challengers were likely to succeed on the merits and faced irreparable harm – rather than applying a heightened "indisputably clear" standard for emergency injunctions from the Supreme Court. The decision concluded by criticizing the Ninth Circuit, noting that the court had just rejected the Ninth Circuit's interpretation of California's COVID-related restrictions on religious exercise for the fifth time.

=== Dissents ===
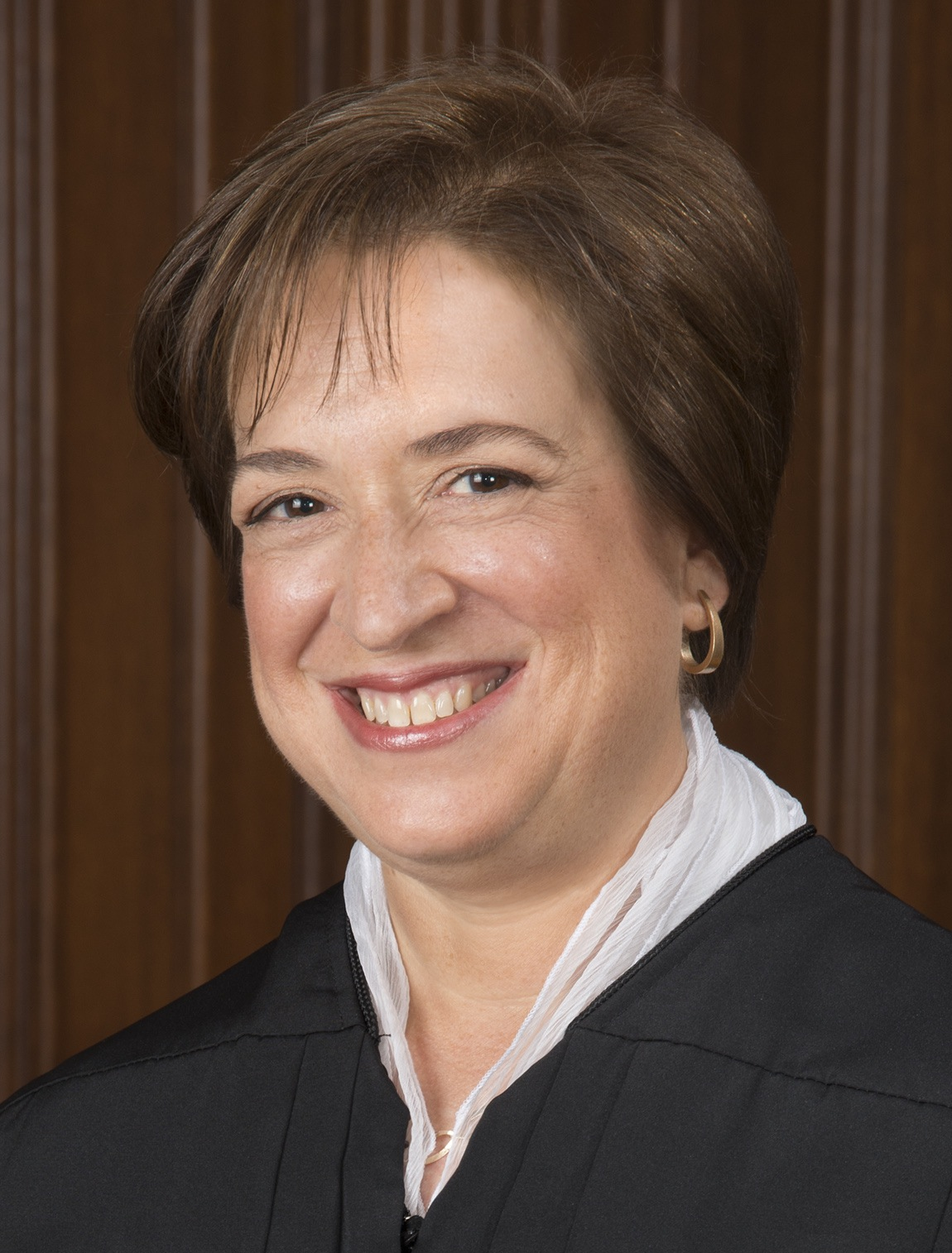
Elena Kagan (2013), who wrote the dissenting opinion

Chief Justice John Roberts noted he dissented from the order, but did not write or join an opinion.

Kagan filed a dissent, joined by Stephen Breyer and Sonia Sotomayor. While acknowledging that it was sometimes difficult to determine which secular activity should be compared to the religious activity, she argued that in-home gatherings were the "obvious comparator". The restriction applied to secular gatherings in the house, so the regulation was neutral and generally applicable and thus should survive the challenge to its constitutionality. She also noted that the lower courts had determined that there were varying degrees of risk linked to short visits to secular businesses versus extended gatherings in private homes, and criticized the court for disregarding the factual record of risk assessments because it would support denying the injunction.

== Aftermath ==
On June 24, 2021, by agreement of the parties, the district court issued a stipulated final judgment that included a permanent injunction and an award of $500,000 to the plaintiffs for their reasonable attorney's fees.

== Significance ==
Professor James Oleske, a leading American scholar of law and religion, described Tandon as the "most important free exercise decision since 1990". Oleske elaborated that lower courts had argued over the most-favored nation approach for 30 years. The court had previously granted certiorari in Fulton v. City of Philadelphia, partially to consider adopting the most-favored nation approach, and Oleske stated that "adopting the most-favored-nation theory in Fulton would have been big news." Tandon had answered one of the key questions Fulton was supposed to answer.

Steve Vladeck commented on the significance of using the shadow docket to change what was protected by the Constitution, and the fact that none of the opinions even noted the use of the shadow docket. He argued that it showed the court thought "the posture" – whether a case followed the ordinary procedure or used the emergency shadow docket – "of the case was irrelevant". He continued by commenting that the justices would have voted on Fulton on November 6, 2020, and thus the justices were writing their Fulton opinions during the resolution of Tandon. This indicates that the justices "preferred to make significant new constitutional law on the shadow docket rather than through the regular—if laborious—procedure of a merits case" (emphasis in original).
