= Seila Law LLC v. Consumer Financial Protection Bureau =

- Supreme Court of the United States

Argued March 3, 2020 Decided June 29, 2020
- Full case name: Seila Law LLC v. Consumer Financial Protection Bureau
- Docket no.: 19-7
- Citations: 591 U.S. 197 (more) 140 S. Ct. 2183
- Argument: Oral argument

Case history
- Prior: Consumer Financial Protection Bureau v. Seila Law LLC, 923 F.3d 680 (9th Cir. 2019), affirming Consumer Financial Protection Bureau v. Seila Law LLC, No. 8:17-cv-01081-JLS-JEM, 2017 WL 6536586 (C.D. Cal. 2017)

Holding
- The CFPB’s leadership by a single individual removable only for inefficiency, neglect, or malfeasance violates the separation of powers.

Court membership
- Chief Justice John Roberts Associate Justices Clarence Thomas · Ruth Bader Ginsburg; Stephen Breyer · Samuel Alito; Sonia Sotomayor · Elena Kagan; Neil Gorsuch · Brett Kavanaugh

Case opinions
- Majority: Roberts (Parts I, II, and III), joined by Thomas, Alito, Gorsuch, Kavanaugh
- Plurality: Roberts (Part IV), joined by Alito, Kavanaugh
- Concur/dissent: Thomas, joined by Gorsuch
- Concur/dissent: Kagan (concurring in the judgment with respect to severability and dissenting in part), joined by Ginsburg, Breyer, Sotomayor

Laws applied
- U.S. Const., Art. II, §2, cl. 2 Dodd–Frank Wall Street Reform and Consumer Protection Act

Seila Law LLC v. Consumer Financial Protection Bureau, 591 U.S. 197 (2020) was a U.S. Supreme Court decision which held that the structure of the Consumer Financial Protection Bureau (CFPB), with a single director who could only be removed from office "for cause", violated the separation of powers principle in the U.S. Constitution. Handed down on June 29, 2020, the Court's 5–4 decision created a new test to determine when Congress may limit the power of the President of the United States to remove an officer of the United States from office.

The Court recognized that the President may generally remove officers at will. However, the Court stated that there were two exceptions to this rule. First, the President's removal power may be constrained by Congress if the officer in question is a member of an agency that shares similar characteristics to the Federal Trade Commission as discussed in Humphrey's Executor v. United States (1935). Second, Congress may constrain the President's removal power over "inferior officers with limited duties and no policymaking" role as discussed in Morrison v. Olson (1988). The Court declined to extend the exceptions to "an independent agency led by a single director and vested with significant executive power."

The Court also held that the directorship position was severable from the statute that established the CFPB, allowing the CFPB to continue to operate.

== Background ==
The Consumer Financial Protection Bureau (CFPB) was envisioned by Elizabeth Warren while she was still a law professor at Harvard Law School. In 2010, it was established by the 2010 Dodd–Frank Wall Street Reform and Consumer Protection Act under President Barack Obama and the Democrat-led Congress. It was designed to protect consumers and promote regulations to prevent similar events such as the Great Recession that ran from 2007 to 2009. To be able to promote these regulations, it was determined that the agency needed to be independent, and thus Congress designed the agency to have a single director, selected by the president with confirmation by the Senate, appointed to a five-year term, and who could only be removed for "inefficiency, neglect of duty, or malfeasance in office." Since its establishment, the CFPB has actively gone after banks and other financial service providers that have been determined to be "bad actors", such as when it fined Wells Fargo $100 million due to the Wells Fargo cross-selling scandal.

The CFPB had been seen as a bane by the Republican Party and as a sign of government overreach. In the years after it was established, Republicans gained control of the Senate, and Donald Trump became president in 2017, putting the CFPB under scrutiny. Businesses that also shared a dismissive view of the CFPB began to file lawsuits challenging the constitutionality of the CFPB's organizational structure. These lawsuits focused on the for-cause termination statute around the CFPB's directorship position. For-cause removal of agency executives presents a prima facie challenge to the separation of powers, because it places a limit—imposed by Congress—on the president's Article II authority over executive branch officials. Most courts that had considered the question found that for-cause removal of the CFPB director was constitutional. However, the Supreme Court's "precedents on for-cause removal [were] a jurisprudential train wreck."

== Case history ==
Seila Law LLC (Seila Law), a law firm that provided debt relief services, was under investigation by the CFPB. As part of its investigation, the CFPB issued a civil investigative demand (CID) to Seila Law, which required Seila Law to produce certain documents. Seila Law declined to comply with the CID and challenged the constitutionality of the CFPB. Judge Josephine Staton of the United States District Court for the Central District of California found the CFPB to be constitutionally structured.

On appeal at the Ninth Circuit, the circuit panel affirmed the district court's ruling, and agreed that the Supreme Court's prior decisions upholding for-cause removal in Humphrey's Executor and Morrison were controlling. It also referred approvingly to the en banc decision of the DC Circuit in PHH Corp. v. CFPB (2018), in which the Circuit found that the structure of the CFPB was constitutional.

== Supreme Court ==
=== Majority opinion ===
The Supreme Court granted certiorari in Seila Law on October 18, 2019, and heard oral argument on March 3, 2020. The Court issued its decision on June 29, 2020. Chief Justice John Roberts wrote the opinion of the Court, joined by justices Clarence Thomas, Samuel Alito, Neil Gorsuch, and Brett Kavanaugh. The 5–4 decision ruled that the CFPB structure, with a sole director that could only be terminated for cause, was unconstitutional as it violated the separation of powers. Specifically, the Court held that Article II of the Constitution gives the president the power to remove principal officers at will except for two exceptions recognized under case law. The first exception was based on Humphrey's Executor v. United States. Roberts narrowly construed Humphrey's Executor to stand for the proposition that the president's removal power may be constrained by Congress if the officer in question was a member of an agency that shared the same characteristics as the Federal Trade Commission (FTC) in 1935. In Humphrey's, the FTC was described as "exercis[ing] no part of the executive power" and as "an administrative body ... that perform[ed] ... specified duties as a legislative or as a judicial aid". Because the CFPB was dissimilar from that description, the Court held that the exception did not apply.

The second exception to the president's at-will removal power came from Morrison v. Olson which held that Congress could constrain the president's removal power over "inferior officers with limited duties and no policymaking" role. Because the CFPB director was not an inferior officer, the Court held that this exception did not apply.

Having determined that the insulation of the CFPB director did not fall under an established exception, Chief Justice Roberts then looked to see whether the Court should "extend those precedents to ... an independent agency led by a single director and vested with significant executive power". He reasoned no. Roberts wrote that the CFPB structure with a single point of leadership that could only be removed for cause "ha[d] no foothold in history or tradition", and had only been used in four other instances: three modern uses for the United States Office of Special Counsel, the Social Security Administration, and the Federal Housing Finance Agency, and temporarily for one year during the American Civil War for the Office of the Comptroller of the Currency. Roberts wrote that the three current uses "are modern and contested. And they do not involve regulatory or enforcement authority comparable to that exercised by the CFPB." Roberts also wrote that the CFPB structure "is also incompatible with the structure of the Constitution, which—with the sole exception of the presidency—scrupulously avoids concentrating power in the hands of any single individual." In support of this position, Roberts also cited the Decision of 1789.

The Court also held that the statutes around the director of the CFPB was severable from the rest of the statute establishing the agency, and thus "[t]he agency may therefore continue to operate, but its director, in light of our decision, must be removable by the president at will." The Court vacated the lower court's judgement and remanded the case for review. The dissenting justices concurred on the matter of severability.

=== Concurrence ===
Justice Thomas wrote a partial concurrence, joined by Justice Gorsuch, adding that he believed that Humphrey's Executor should be overturned and all "for cause" terminations positions should be considered unconstitutional. Thomas also wrote that he believed there was no need to resolve the severability matter for the case at hand.

=== Dissent ===
Justice Elena Kagan wrote a dissent joined by justices Ruth Bader Ginsburg, Stephen Breyer, and Sonia Sotomayor. The Kagan dissent struck a functionalist tone in contrast with the formalism apparent in the Court's opinion. Kagan challenged the argument presented by the majority stating that "[n]owhere does the text [of the Constitution] say anything about the president's power to remove subordinate officials at will." She also contested the majority's characterization of Article II's Take Care Clause as conferring power to the president. Kagan wrote that to the extent the clause gives the president any power—instead of merely conferring a duty upon them—it is only power to ensure that "the laws are faithfully executed." Kagan also challenged Roberts' characterization of the Decision of 1789, stating that "[t]he best view is that the First Congress 'was deeply divided' on the president's removal power, and 'never squarely addressed' the central issue here." Finally, she questioned why it was relevant that the head of the CFPB was an independent director and not an independent commission, as independent commissions theoretically cause a higher diffusion of executive power than a single director does.

== Commentary and impact ==
Seila Law has been the subject of numerous law review articles. Its use of precedent has perplexed legal scholars. Important questions raised by commentators post-Seila include:

- Do Myers and Humphrey's Executor "still stand for the proposition that Congress can impose limitations on the president's removal authority for agency heads as long as it does not retain a role for itself?"
- If Humphrey's Executor and Morrison v. Olson are exceptions "to the view that Congress cannot impose limitations on the president's removal authority, what is the scope of these exceptions?"
- "Is there really a conceptually relevant difference between agencies with one head and those with multiple heads? Is the modern-day FTC now vulnerable?"

Professor Edward Cantu wrote that "[c]onsistent with how the Court has always approached separation-of-powers decisions, Seila should be viewed not as anti-pragmatic formalism but as pragmatic posturing."

The majority opinion has also been written about as an example of a case based on the unitary executive theory. Thomas A. Barnico, a professor at Boston College Law School, noted that the case raised federalism issues. In particular, he suggested that the CFPB's power to pre-empt state legislation presented special concerns regarding accountability for its leadership.

Subsequent to the decision, the Supreme Court agreed to review the Fifth Circuit's decision in Collins v. Mnuchin related to the Federal Housing Finance Agency (FHFA) that had been established with the same single-administrator position, dismissable only for cause, as the CFPB. In June 2021, the Supreme Court affirmed the Fifth Circuit's decision in light of Seila Law that the FHFA directorship position's termination allowance was unconstitutional but otherwise left the FHFA in place.

== See also ==
- Consumer Financial Protection Bureau v. Community Financial Services Association of America, Limited
- Collins v. Yellen
