= United States v. Cooley =

2021 United States Supreme Court case regarding powers of tribal police

- Supreme Court of the United States

Argued March 23, 2021 Decided June 1, 2021
- Full case name: United States v. Cooley
- Docket no.: 19-1414
- Argument: Oral argument

Holding
- A tribal police officer may, with probable cause, detain and search non-Native people traveling on public roads through a reservation.

Court membership
- Chief Justice John Roberts Associate Justices Clarence Thomas · Stephen Breyer; Samuel Alito · Sonia Sotomayor; Elena Kagan · Neil Gorsuch; Brett Kavanaugh · Amy Coney Barrett

Case opinions
- Majority: Breyer, joined by unanimous
- Concurrence: Alito

United States v. Cooley (2021) was a Supreme Court of the United States case on the powers of tribal police.

== Background ==
The case stemmed from a 2016 incident where a tribal police officer detained a non-tribal motorist found with guns and drugs. In lower courts it had been argued that evidence gathered by Native American police should not be admissible in cases regarding non-Native Americans.

== Decision ==
The case was argued on March 23, 2021. The case was decided unanimously on June 1, 2021, allowing tribal police to detain and investigate those suspected of criminal activity on tribal lands regardless of racial status. The court found that in such cases non-natives may be detained when on a public right of way inside a reservation. Non-native detainees may be detained for a reasonable length of time until non-tribal police can arrive at the scene to handle the incident. The opinion for the case was written by Justice Stephen Breyer. A concurring opinion was written by Justice Samuel Alito.
