= Niz-Chavez v. Garland =

2021 U.S. Supreme Court case

- Supreme Court of the United States

Argued November 9, 2020 Decided April 29, 2021
- Full case name: Agusto Niz-Chavez, Petitioner v. Merrick B. Garland, Attorney General
- Docket no.: 19-863
- Citations: 593 U.S. 155 (more) 141 S. Ct. 1474; 209 L. Ed. 2d 433

Case history
- Prior: Niz-Chavez v. Barr, 789 F. App'x 523 (6th Cir. 2019); Cert. granted, Niz-Chavez v. Barr, 141 S. Ct. 84 (2020)

Holding
- A notice to appear sufficient to trigger the IIRIRA's stop-time rule is a single document containing all the information about an individual's removal hearing specified in §1229(a)(1).

Court membership
- Chief Justice John Roberts Associate Justices Clarence Thomas · Stephen Breyer; Samuel Alito · Sonia Sotomayor; Elena Kagan · Neil Gorsuch; Brett Kavanaugh · Amy Coney Barrett

Case opinions
- Majority: Gorsuch, joined by Thomas, Breyer, Sotomayor, Kagan, Barrett
- Dissent: Kavanaugh, joined by Roberts, Alito

Laws applied
- IIRIRA, 8 U.S.C. § 1229

Niz-Chavez v. Garland, 593 U.S. 155 (2021), was an immigration decision by the United States Supreme Court. In a 6–3 decision authored by Neil Gorsuch, the Court ruled against the federal government, holding that deportation hearing notices need to be in a single document. Although a highly technical case, the decision received attention for being predicated on the single-letter word a.

== Background ==
Non-citizens are eligible to apply to the attorney general for cancellation of deportation if they meet certain criteria: for permanent residents, they must have had seven years' "continuous residence" and for non-permanent residents, ten years' "continuous presence". However, per the "stop-time rule", this timer can be stopped by being issued a "notice to appear" at a deportation hearing. This clause was intended to prevent immigrants from accumulating time because of a slow-moving deportation process.

Agusto Niz-Chavez, an unauthorized immigrant from Guatemala, entered the United States in 2005, fleeing after he had been threatened with his land being seized and family killed. He had been reported to the government following various driving infractions. In 2013, he received documents to appear at a deportation hearing in two separate installments. While the first document did not state where or when he needed to attend the hearing, the second, received two months later, did.

Following unsuccessful requests to have his deportation canceled, an appeal to the Board of Immigration Appeals was made; among the arguments, Niz-Chavez asserted that he had been inadequately notified and hence the stop-time rule had not been invoked. The appeal was rejected by the Board as well as by the Court of Appeals for the Sixth Circuit.

== Supreme Court ==
Following the Sixth Circuit's rejection of the appeal in October 2019, a petition for a writ of certiorari was filed in January 2020 and granted in June 2020, there having been a circuit split on the issue. The Supreme Court had previously ruled on the stop-time rule in Pereira v. Sessions and Barton v. Barr, ruling that notices to appear without times and dates could not cause the stop-time rule to be invoked in Pereira. However, it did not rule on whether a collection of notices could constitute a single notice to appear, especially where one of the notices did not contain the required information.

The highly technical case was previously titled Niz-Chavez v. Barr, having had its oral arguments during the Trump administration. William Barr left office as Attorney General of the United States in December 2020, with Merrick Garland being confirmed by the Senate in March 2021 after the Biden administration took office.

=== Oral arguments ===
In oral arguments, the plaintiff's lawyer, David Zimmer, argued that the use of the word "a" preceding the words "notice to appear" signified that Congress had intended for the process to be underpinned by one document; he also stated that it had intentionally moved away from a two-step process. The Justice Department's lawyer, Anthony Yang, argued that a "written notice" could come in more than one document, highlighting that in Oregon law, notices to arbitrate could be served over several documents.

Under further questioning, Chief Justice Roberts elicited a stance from the defendant's legal team that while two documents in different envelopes received on the same day would be inadmissible, two documents in a single envelope would not. Zimmer further argued that Congress had attempted to simplify the process for immigrants when it required the notice to appear to be in a single document. Justice Gorsuch referred back to the Court's prior decision in Pereira, criticizing the government for not having "taken the hint from the eight-justice majority" in that case and calling the case "Pereira Groundhog Day".

Gorsuch pressed Zimmer on why the Court should not treat the immigration authorities' stance on whether multiple documents could invoke the stop-time rule with Chevron deference, with Zimmer replying that the stance had not been based on the text of the law. Following oral arguments, SCOTUSblog's Jayesh Rathod predicted that there was a good chance of "another lopsided decision in favor of noncitizens", referring to Pereira.

=== Majority opinion ===
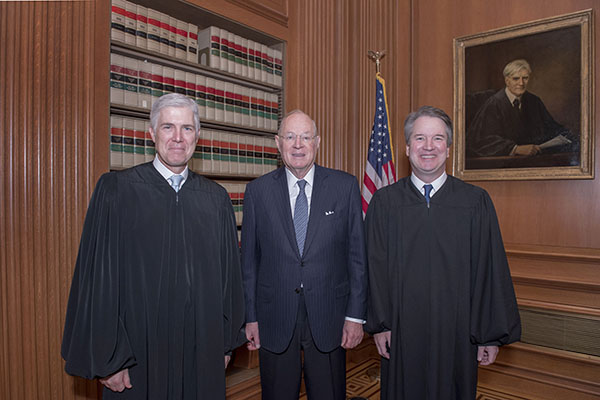
Retired justice Anthony Kennedy flanked by Neil Gorsuch (left) and Brett Kavanaugh (right). Both opinion writers had attended the same school and clerked for Kennedy together.

The majority opinion attracted attention for being based on the single-letter word a and for its "odd bedfellows", with three "conservative" justices (Justice Gorsuch as author, joined by Justices Thomas and Barrett) and three "liberal" justices (Justices Breyer, Sotomayor, and Kagan) signing on to the opinion.

Focusing on that shortest word and criticizing the government's stance, Gorsuch wrote:

To trigger the stop-time rule, the government must serve a notice containing all the information Congress has specified. To an ordinary reader—both in 1996 and today—a notice would seem to suggest just that: a single document containing the required information, not a mishmash of pieces with some assembly required ... To build on an illustration we used in Pereira, someone who agrees to buy "a car" would hardly expect to receive the chassis today, wheels next week, and an engine to follow.

Distinguishing between the use of notice as either a "countable object" or a "noncountable abstraction", he stated the use of a meant that lawmakers had intended for it to be the former. He wrote in summation:

At one level, today's dispute may seem semantic, focused on a single word, a small one at that. But words are how the law constrains power. In this case, the law's terms ensure that, when the federal government seeks a procedural advantage against an individual, it will at least supply him with a single and reasonably comprehensive statement of the nature of the proceedings against him. If men must turn square corners when they deal with the government, it cannot be too much to expect the government to turn square corners when it deals with them.

=== Dissenting opinion ===
Written by Justice Kavanaugh joined by Chief Justice Roberts and Justice Alito, the opinion scorched the majority for an interpretation that was "rather perplexing as a matter of statutory interpretation and common sense" and one that "spawns a litany of absurdities", referring back to the petitioner's argument that documents received on the same day but in different envelopes would be inadequate.

The statute nowhere says that written notice must be provided in a single document. Rather, the statute lists three essential requirements ... Nothing more. But the Court today nonetheless imposes a fourth, atextual single-document requirement for the notice to stop the 10-year clock.

Criticizing the majority's overly literalist reading and invoking Justice Antonin Scalia's words that a "good textualist is not a literalist", he wrote: "Ordinary meaning and literal meaning are two different things. And judges interpreting statutes should follow ordinary meaning, not literal meaning." He went further, elaborating:

As a matter of ordinary parlance, however, the word a is not a one-size-fits-all word. As relevant here, the word a is sometimes used to modify a single thing that must be delivered in one package, but it is sometimes used to modify a single thing that can be delivered in multiple installments, rather than in one installment. Context is critical to determine the proper meaning of a in a particular phrase.

In response to Gorsuch's analogy of a car being sent in installments, Kavanaugh raised examples of job applications and a manuscript being submitted by an author chapter-by-chapter as acceptable instances of installments.

== Effects and analysis ==
The American Immigration Lawyers' Association called the decision a "bombshell", with campaigners critical that the previous state of affairs had meant that many immigrants failed to attend their hearings and were not aware that they had one in the first place. Numerous requests to stop deportations where immigrants were not told a venue or date were granted by judges as a result of the case; experts warned that the courts would be "flooded" with these motions. Stephen Yale-Loehr, a professor at Cornell Law School, predicted that there would be greater delays in people being placed into the deportation process. As of July 2021, Niz-Chavez's wife has been deported, and he is waiting for a new hearing at immigration court, living in Michigan as of April.

Legal analysts drew parallels between Niz-Chavez and Bostock v. Clayton County, highlighting that Gorsuch and Kavanaugh were again at odds despite having both been Trump appointees, former law clerks to Anthony Kennedy, and attendees of Georgetown Preparatory School. Observers also noted Gorsuch's textualism and libertarianism driving his opinion, with CNN noting that his textualism had underpinned both this case and Bostock.
