= Greer v. United States (2021) =

- Supreme Court of the United States

Decided June 14, 2021
- Full case name: Greer v. United States
- Docket no.: 19-8709
- Citations: 593 U.S. 503 (more)

Holding
- An unobjected-to failure to instruct the jury that the defendant must have known they were a felon is not structural error requiring reversal. Moreover, it would be difficult to show plain error because "convicted felons ordinarily know that they are convicted felons."

Court membership
- Chief Justice John Roberts Associate Justices Clarence Thomas · Stephen Breyer; Samuel Alito · Sonia Sotomayor; Elena Kagan · Neil Gorsuch; Brett Kavanaugh · Amy Coney Barrett

Case opinions
- Majority: Kavanaugh
- Concur/dissent: Sotomayor

Greer v. United States, 593 U.S. 503 (2021), was a United States Supreme Court case in which the Court held that an unobjected-to failure to instruct the jury that the defendant must have known they were a felon is not structural error requiring reversal. Moreover, it would be difficult to show plain error because "convicted felons ordinarily know that they are convicted felons." The case was consolidated with United States v. Gary; Sotomayor dissented to the court's assessment of Gary.
