= Carr v. Saul =

- Supreme Court of the United States

Argued March 3, 2021 Decided April 22, 2021
- Full case name: Willie Earl Carr, et al. v. Andrew M. Saul, Commissioner of Social Security; John J. Davis, et al. v. Andrew M. Saul, Commissioner of Social Security
- Docket nos.: 19-1442; 20-105
- Citations: 593 U.S. ___ (more)
- Argument: Oral argument

Holding
- A petitioner need not challenge the constitutionality of an agency's structure under the Appointments Clause in an internal agency administrative proceeding in order to present that challenge in court on appeal.

Court membership
- Chief Justice John Roberts Associate Justices Clarence Thomas · Stephen Breyer; Samuel Alito · Sonia Sotomayor; Elena Kagan · Neil Gorsuch; Brett Kavanaugh · Amy Coney Barrett

Case opinions
- Majority: Sotomayor, joined by Roberts, Alito, Kagan, Kavanaugh; Thomas, Gorsuch, Barrett (Parts I, II–A, and II–B–2); Breyer (Parts I, II–B–1, and II–B–2)
- Concurrence: Thomas (in part and in the judgment), joined by Gorsuch, Barrett
- Concurrence: Breyer (in part and in the judgment)

Laws applied
- U.S. Const. art. II, § 2, cl. 2

Carr v. Saul, 593 U.S. 83 (2021), was a United States Supreme Court case in which the court held that a petitioner need not challenge the constitutionality of an agency's structure under the Appointments Clause in an internal agency administrative proceeding in order to present that challenge in court on appeal.

== Background ==
Six petitioners (including Carr) who applied for disability benefits were denied by the Social Security Administration (SSA). They each unsuccessfully challenged their respective adverse benefit determination in a hearing before an SSA administrative law judge (ALJ). The SSA Appeals Council denied discretionary review in each case. Thereafter, the Supreme Court decided Lucia v. SEC, which held that the appointment of Securities and Exchange Commission ALJs by lower level staff violated the Constitution's Appointments Clause. Because the SSA ALJs who denied these claims were also appointed by lower level staff, petitioners argued in federal court that they were entitled to a fresh administrative review by constitutionally appointed ALJs. In each case, the Court of Appeals held that petitioners could not obtain judicial review of their Appointments Clause claims because they failed to raise those challenges in their administrative proceedings.

== Opinion of the court ==
The Supreme Court issued an opinion on April 22, 2021. It unanimously held that the Court of Appeals erred in imposing an issue-exhaustion requirement on petitioners' Appointment Clause claims. The opinion was delivered by Sonia Sotomayor.
