= Lange v. California =

- Supreme Court of the United States

Argued February 24, 2021 Decided June 23, 2021
- Full case name: Lange v. California
- Docket no.: 20-18
- Citations: 594 U.S. 295 (more)

Holding
- Under the Fourth Amendment, pursuit of a fleeing misdemeanor suspect does not always or categorically qualify as an exigent circumstance justifying a warrantless entry into a home.

Court membership
- Chief Justice John Roberts Associate Justices Clarence Thomas · Stephen Breyer; Samuel Alito · Sonia Sotomayor; Elena Kagan · Neil Gorsuch; Brett Kavanaugh · Amy Coney Barrett

Case opinions
- Majority: Kagan, joined by Breyer, Sotomayor, Gorsuch, Kavanaugh, Barrett; Thomas (all but Part II–A)
- Concurrence: Kavanaugh
- Concurrence: Thomas (in part), joined by Kavanaugh (Part II)
- Concurrence: Roberts (in judgment), joined by Alito

Laws applied
- U.S. Const. amend. IV

Lange v. California, 594 U.S. 295 (2021), was a United States Supreme Court case involving the exigent circumstances requirement related to the Fourth Amendment to the United States Constitution. The Court ruled unanimously that the warrantless entry into a home by police in pursuit of a misdemeanant is not unequivocally justified.

== Background ==
In October 2016, a California highway patrol officer witnessed Arthur Lange driving while playing loud music and honking his horn. Believing Lange to be in violation of California traffic law, the officer attempted to perform a traffic stop. Lange drove to his garage and then closed the garage but the officer, who had followed him to his home, entered the garage and began to question Lange. After smelling alcohol on his breath and conducting a field sobriety test, the officer arrested Lange and charged him with driving under the influence and a noise infraction.

Lange attempted to argue at trial that the officer's entry into his garage without a warrant had violated his Fourth Amendment rights and therefore evidence related to the case had to be suppressed. The prosecution argued that under the "hot pursuit doctrine" the officer had probable cause to enter the garage because Lange had committed a misdemeanor when he failed to stop for the officer. The court subsequently denied Lange's motion to suppress the evidence. As a result, Lange's driver's license was suspended for a period of one year.

=== Initial appeals ===
Lange filed a suit to overturn the suspension of his license in civil court which was accepted after the court determined his arrest to be unlawful. However the Sonoma County Superior Court affirmed the decision of the trial court to deny Lange's motion to suppress. The California Court of Appeal also upheld the conviction. In July 2020, Lange applied for a writ of certiorari from the Supreme Court which was granted in October 2020.

== Opinion of the Court ==
Certiorari was granted in the case on October 19, 2020. The case was argued on February 24, 2021, and decided on June 23, 2021. In a unanimous decision, Justice Elena Kagan delivered the majority opinion.

The Fourth Amendment ordinarily requires that police officers get a warrant before entering a home without permission. But an officer may make a warrantless entry when “the exigencies of the situation” create a compelling law enforcement need. Kentucky v. King, 563 U.S. 452, 460 (2011). The question presented here is whether the pursuit of a fleeing misdemeanor suspect always—or more legally put, categorically—qualifies as an exigent circumstance. We hold it does not. A great many misdemeanor pursuits involve exigencies allowing warrantless entry. But whether a given one does so turns on the particular facts of the case. The flight of a suspected misdemeanant does not always justify a warrantless entry into a home. An officer must consider all the circumstances in a pursuit case to determine whether there is a law enforcement emergency. On many occasions, the officer will have good reason to enter— to prevent imminent harms of violence, destruction of evidence, or escape from the home. But when the officer has time to get a warrant, he must do so—even though the misdemeanant fled. Because the California Court of Appeal applied the categorical rule we reject today, we vacate its judgment and remand the case for further proceedings not inconsistent with this opinion.

=== Chief Justice Roberts' concurrence ===
Chief Justice John Roberts filed a concurring opinion, joined by Justice Samuel Alito. Roberts argued that police should have the flexibility to pursue suspected criminals regardless of the crime while noting that the ruling will confound law enforcement.

Suppose a police officer on patrol responds to a report of a man assaulting a teenager. Arriving at the scene, the officer sees the teenager vainly trying to ward off the assailant. The officer attempts to place the assailant under arrest, but he takes off on foot. He leads the officer on a chase over several blocks as the officer yells for him to stop. With the officer closing in, the suspect leaps over a fence and then stands on a home’s front yard. He claims it’s his home and tells the officer to stay away. What is the officer to do?

The Fourth Amendment and our precedent—not to mention common sense—provide a clear answer: The officer can enter the property to complete the arrest he lawfully initiated outside it. But the Court today has a different take. Holding that flight, on its own, can never justify a warrantless entry into a home (including its curtilage), the Court requires that the officer: (1) stop and consider whether the suspect—if apprehended—would be charged with a misdemeanor or a felony, and (2) tally up other “exigencies” that might be present or arise, ante, at 1, 4, before (3) deciding whether he can complete the arrest or must instead seek a warrant—one that, in all likelihood, will not arrive for hours. Meanwhile, the suspect may stroll into the home and then dash out the back door. Or, for all the officer knows, get a gun and take aim from inside.

The Constitution does not demand this absurd and dangerous result. We should not impose it. As our precedent makes clear, hot pursuit is not merely a setting in which other exigent circumstances justifying warrantless entry might emerge. It is itself an exigent circumstance. And we have never held that whether an officer may enter a home to complete an arrest turns on what the fleeing individual was suspected of doing before he took off, let alone whether that offense would later be charged as a misdemeanor or felony. It is the flight, not the underlying offense, that has always been understood to justify the general rule: “Police officers may enter premises without a warrant when they are in hot pursuit of a fleeing suspect.”

=== Justice Thomas' concurrence ===
I join the majority opinion, except for Part II–A, which correctly rejects the argument that suspicion that a person committed any crime justifies warrantless entry into a home in hot pursuit of that person. I write separately to note two things: the general case-by-case rule that the Court announces today is subject to historical, categorical exceptions; and under our precedent, the federal exclusionary rule does not apply to evidence discovered in the course of pursuing a fleeing suspect. I join the relevant parts of the majority on the understanding that its general case-by-case rule does not foreclose historical, categorical exceptions. Although the majority unnecessarily leads with doctrine before history, it does not disturb our regular rule that history—not court-created standards of reasonableness—dictates the outcome whenever it provides an answer.

=== Justice Kavanaugh's concurrence ===
Kavanaugh sided with Chief Justice Roberts and Justice Thomas in his concurring opinion, noting that a felon fleeing law enforcement is in itself an exigent circumstance.

The Court holds that an officer may make a warrantless entry into a home when pursuing a fleeing misdemeanant if an exigent circumstance is also present—for example, when there is a risk of escape, destruction of evidence, or harm to others. I join the Court’s opinion. I also join Part II of JUSTICE THOMAS’s concurrence regarding how the exclusionary rule should apply to hot pursuit cases. I add this brief concurrence simply to underscore that, in my view, there is almost no daylight in practice between the Court’s opinion and THE CHIEF JUSTICE’s opinion concurring in the judgment.
