= Collins v. Yellen =

- Supreme Court of the United States

Argued December 9, 2020 Decided June 23, 2021
- Full case name: Patrick J. Collins, et al. v. Janet L. Yellen, Secretary of the Treasury, et al.; Janet L. Yellen, Secretary of the Treasury, et al. v. Patrick J. Collins, et al.
- Docket nos.: 19-422; 19-563
- Citations: 594 U.S. ___ (more)

Case history
- Prior: Collins v. Fed. Hous. Fin. Agency, 254 F. Supp. 3d 841 (S.D. Tex. 2017); Affirmed in part, reversed in part sub nom. Collins v. Mnuchin, 896 F.3d 640 (5th Cir. 2018); On rehearing en banc, 938 F.3d 553 (5th Cir. 2019); Cert. granted, 141 S.Ct. 193 (2020)

Holding
- 1. The shareholders’ statutory claim must be dismissed. The "anti-injunction clause" of the Recovery Act provides that unless review is specifically authorized by one of its provisions or is requested by the Director, "no court may take any action to restrain or affect the exercise of powers or functions of the Agency as a conservator or a receiver." 2. The Recovery Act’s restriction on the President’s power to remove the FHFA Director, 12 U.S.C. §4512(b)(2), is unconstitutional.

Court membership
- Chief Justice John Roberts Associate Justices Clarence Thomas · Stephen Breyer; Samuel Alito · Sonia Sotomayor; Elena Kagan · Neil Gorsuch; Brett Kavanaugh · Amy Coney Barrett

Case opinions
- Majority: Alito, joined by Roberts, Thomas, Kavanaugh, Barrett; Breyer, Kagan (all but Part III–B); Gorsuch (all but Part III–C); Sotomayor (Parts I, II, and III–C)
- Concurrence: Thomas
- Concurrence: Gorsuch (in part)
- Concurrence: Kagan (in part and in the judgment), joined by Breyer, Sotomayor (Part II)
- Concur/dissent: Sotomayor, joined by Breyer

Collins v. Yellen, 594 U.S. 220 (2021), (Note: The case was titled Collins v. Mnuchin until Janet Yellen replaced Steven Mnuchin as Secretary of the Treasury.) was a United States Supreme Court case dealing with the structure of the Federal Housing Finance Agency (FHFA). The case follows on the Court's prior ruling in Seila Law LLC v. Consumer Financial Protection Bureau, which found that the establishing structure of the Consumer Financial Protection Bureau (CFPB), with a single director who could only be removed from office "for cause", violated the separation of powers; the FHFA shares a similar structure as the CFPB. The case extends the legal challenge to the federal takeover of Fannie Mae and Freddie Mac in 2008.

In a two-part decision, the Supreme Court ruled that the restriction on removal of the FHFA director by the President was unconstitutional in light of Seila Law, and secondly, dismissed the lawsuit brought against the FHFA by shareholders of Fannie Mae and Freddie Mac as the takeover of these firms was an established power of the agency under terms of the Housing and Economic Recovery Act of 2008.

== Background ==
Part of the contributing factors to the subprime mortgage crisis from 2007 to 2010 was the role of Fannie Mae and Freddie Mac, for-profit government sponsored enterprises (GSE) that purchase mortgages and backed almost half of the mortgages in the United States. Analysis had found that the two GSEs had purchased a number of risky mortgages, those offered at below the prime interest rate as to encourage home ownership, during the housing market peak in 2005 and 2006 and represented a large risk should they fail. At the start of the crisis, the rationalization of the number of these low-interest mortgages disrupted the banking system, causing some larger banks to go into bankruptcy or seek means to avoid this, which disrupted the credit system and further exacerbated the crisis and caused a recession.

Congress passed the Housing and Economic Recovery Act of 2008 in July of that year to try to stave off the effects of the recession. Among the law's goals included the formation of the Federal Housing Finance Agency (FHFA), merging the existing Federal Housing Finance Board (FHFB) and Office of Federal Housing Enterprise Oversight (OFHEO). The new FHFA was run by a single Director, with James B. Lockhart III, the prior Director of OFHEO, named to the initial position. In September 2008, Lockhart issued an order to bring in Fannie Mae and Freddie Mac under FHFA's authority for the purposes of stabilizing both GSEs using funds allocated by Congress as a means to alleviate the mortgage crisis.

As part of this takeover, once the mortgage crisis was subdued in 2012, the FHFA routed the ongoing profits earned by Fannie Mae and Freddie Mac to the Treasury Department on the basis that these funds were needed to offset the taxpayers' costs of the government's intervention to resolve the crisis. The decision also prevents both GSEs from using Treasury funds to pay their shareholders. Shareholders of both companies challenged the government's actions, stating that these decisions prevent the company from building capital and is excessive governmental overreach.

As the case progressed, the Supreme Court heard Seila Law LLC v. Consumer Financial Protection Bureau. In this case, the structure of the Consumer Financial Protection Bureau (CFPB) was called into question. Like FHFA, the CFPB was formed by legislation passed by Congress, and specified that it was to be overseen by a single Director that can only be removed from office "for cause" and did not give the option for the President to remove the person "at will". The Supreme Court agreed that this structure was unconstitutional as it violated the separation of powers between the executive and legislative branches. The Supreme Court ruled that the Director position of CFPB must be also removable by will, but otherwise did not challenge the function of the CFPB since they had found its purpose to be severable from the implementation of the Director position.

Seila Law progressed through lower courts at the same time as Collins. Seila Law had been heard in the Ninth Circuit, which had ruled that the structure of the CFPB was constitutional. Collins was heard in the Fifth Circuit, which ruled both on its initial three-judge panel and at an en banc hearing that the FHFB was unconstitutional.

Both sides of Collins petitioned to the Supreme Court in 2019 to hear the case; the shareholders sought to resolve the split in the circuit courts as well as to question whether any decisions – including the profit taking decision 2012 – made under the unconstitutional structure should be reversed, while the government challenged the Fifth Circuit's ruling. Following the ruling in Seila Law issued in June 2020, the Supreme Court agreed to hear the case.

== Supreme Court ==
Oral hearings for the case were held on December 9, 2020.

The Supreme Court issued its decision on June 23, 2021. It ruled on two areas which affirmed, reversed, and vacated the Fifth Circuit's decision in parts and remanded the case for further review. On the subject of the constitutionality of the FHFA director, the Court ruled 7–2 to uphold the Fifth Circuit's decision that, as with Seila Law and the CFPB, the inability for the President to terminate the director of FHFA beyond "for cause" was unconstitutional. Related to the standing of the Fannie Mae and Freddie Mac shareholders, the Court was unanimous in that the FHFA's actions in taking over the GSEs was outlined by congressional authority in the Recovery Act of 2008, along with an "anti-injunction clause," and, thus, the lower courts should not have allowed their case to proceed.

Justice Samuel Alito wrote the majority opinion to which all Justices had joined in full or in part. Justices Clarence Thomas, Neil Gorsuch, and Elena Kagan wrote concurring opinions. Justice Sonia Sotomayor wrote an opinion concurring in part and dissenting in part, related to the FHFA directorship, joined by Justice Stephen Breyer.

== Impact ==
On the day of the decision, President Joe Biden moved forward with replacing FHFA director, Mark A. Calabria, who had been appointed under Donald Trump, "with an appointee who reflects the Administration's values".

== See also ==
- Unitary executive theory
