= Fulton v. City of Philadelphia =

- Supreme Court of the United States

Argued November 4, 2020 Decided June 17, 2021
- Full case name: Sharonell Fulton, et al., Petitioners v. City of Philadelphia, Pennsylvania, et al.
- Docket no.: 19-123
- Citations: 593 U.S. 522 (more) 141 S. Ct. 1868; 210 L. Ed. 2d 137

Case history
- Prior: Fulton v. City of Philadelphia, 320 F. Supp. 3d 661 (E.D. Pa. 2018); Affirmed, 922 F.3d 140 (3d Cir. 2019); Cert. granted, 140 S. Ct. 1104 (2020)
- Subsequent: Reversed and remanded (3d Cir. 2021).; Permanent injunction entered (E.D. Pa. 2021).

Holding
- The refusal of Philadelphia to contract with CSS for the provision of foster care services unless CSS agrees to certify same-sex couples as foster parents violates the Free Exercise Clause of the First Amendment

Court membership
- Chief Justice John Roberts Associate Justices Clarence Thomas · Stephen Breyer; Samuel Alito · Sonia Sotomayor; Elena Kagan · Neil Gorsuch; Brett Kavanaugh · Amy Coney Barrett

Case opinions
- Majority: Roberts, joined by Breyer, Sotomayor, Kagan, Kavanaugh, Barrett
- Concurrence: Barrett, joined by Kavanaugh; Breyer (all but first paragraph)
- Concurrence: Alito (in judgment), joined by Thomas, Gorsuch
- Concurrence: Gorsuch (in judgment), joined by Thomas, Alito

Laws applied
- U.S. Const. amend. I

Fulton v. City of Philadelphia, 593 U.S. 522 (2021), was a United States Supreme Court case which held that the City of Philadelphia, Pennsylvania violated First Amendment rights of a Catholic foster care agency by refusing to renew the agency's contract unless it agreed to certify married same-sex couples as foster parents.

In a unanimous judgment on June 17, 2021, the Court ruled that the City's refusal due to the agency's same-sex couple policy violated the Free Exercise Clause. The Court decided the case on narrow grounds outside of the Supreme Court's prior decision in Employment Division v. Smith, which had previously ruled that neutral laws of general applicability could not be challenged for violating religious exemptions. Instead, in Fulton, the Court ruled that services like foster care contracting were not generally applicable under Smith, and thus were subject to strict scrutiny review. Because the City allowed for exceptions to be made in its anti-discrimination policy for foster care certification, the Court deemed the City's refusal to grant an exemption for Catholic Social Services as violating its free exercise of religion under Smith.

== Background ==
The Roman Catholic Archdiocese of Philadelphia runs the Catholic Social Services of the Archdiocese of Philadelphia (CSS), which has operated a foster care agency in Philadelphia for over 100 years. The foster care agency had been registered with the city up through 2018.

The Philadelphia Inquirer ran an article on March 13, 2018, which described the experience of a same-sex couple that went to an information session at Bethany Christian Service, which operated its own foster care service separate from CSS. At the session, the couple were told they would be wasting time because there was a policy for refusing to certify same-sex couples as foster parents. In following up, the reporter discovered that CSS held a similar policy, and had spoken to the city's Department of Human Services, which oversaw regulating foster care services, to notify them of these issues. The Commissioner of Human Services for the city, Cynthia Figueroa, followed up on the report with both CSS and Bethany Christian Services to confirm its veracity towards discrimination against same-sex couples. Figueroa also reviewed the standard with other registered foster care agencies for the city, many also who were also run by religious organizations, but found none of the others had similar restrictions against same-sex couples. Within a few days of the article's publication, the city suspended CSS's contract; the Bethany Christian Service had been able to work a deal to accept foster care from same-sex couples to maintain theirs.

CSS and several foster couples under CSS, including foster mothers Sharonell Fulton and Toni Simms-Busch, brought litigation against the city in the United States District Court for the Eastern District of Pennsylvania under the Free Exercise Clause and Establishment Clause of First Amendment to the United States Constitution, the Pennsylvania State Religious Freedom Restoration Acts, Free Speech Clause of the First Amendment and the Religious Freedom Restoration Act of 1993, Pub. L. No. 103-141, 107 Stat. 1488 (November 16, 1993), codified at 42 U.S.C. § 2000bb through 42 U.S.C. § 2000bb-4 (also known as RFRA). CSS also had argued from the recent Supreme Court decision of Masterpiece Cakeshop v. Colorado Civil Rights Commission that they had been subject to hostility from the city based on anti-religious prejudice. CSS asked the Court to overrule its 1990 decision Employment Division v. Smith which held that "neutral and generally applicable laws" that only incidentally burden the free exercise of religion are subject to rational basis review. CSS also contended that their religious exercise was burdened by the city policy because the city allows race and disability-based exceptions within foster-care placements

The city countered that the precedent set by Employment Division v. Smith, alongside that other agencies in the city with similar religious backing accepted same-sex foster couples, supported the city's decision to terminate CSS's contract. The city of Philadelphia argued that the law is neutral and generally applicable, as required by Smith, and that the Court's ruling in CSS's favor would impinge on the civil rights of not only LGBT individuals but potentially those of such groups as religious minorities.

The District Court refused to grant a preliminary injunction against the city's contract termination, leading CSS to appeal to the Third Circuit. The Third Circuit unanimously ruled against CSS, upholding the city's claim against Employment Division v. Smith.

== Supreme Court ==
CSS and the foster parents petitioned to the Supreme Court to hear the case, which was certified in February 2020. Oral arguments occurred over telephone on November 4, 2020; Neal Katyal offered oral argument for the city.

=== Oral arguments ===
On November 4, the Court heard oral arguments in Fulton. Two conservative members made clear that in their eyes the city of Philadelphia was not respectful of the religious beliefs held by Catholic Social Services (CSS). It appeared to Justice Brett Kavanaugh that Philadelphia was “looking for a fight” by taking an "absolutist and extreme position". Justice Samuel Alito noted that the case wasn't about same-sex couples in Philadelphia having the opportunity to be foster parents, but it's “the fact the city can’t stand the message that Catholic Social Services and the Archdiocese are sending by continuing to adhere to the old-fashioned view about marriage.”

The key issues discussed during oral argument were general applicability under Smith, whether CSS is running a government program or the recipient of a license to provide a service, comparison to other forms of discrimination, and why the case was before the Court when no same-sex couples had ever been turned down by CSS.

According to the New York Times, questions posed by newly appointed Associate Justice Amy Coney Barrett during the case's oral arguments were "evenhanded and did not reveal her position."

=== Decision ===
The Court issued its decision on June 17, 2021. In a unanimous judgment, the Court reversed the Third Circuit's ruling and remanded the case for further review. The majority opinion was written by Chief Justice John Roberts and joined by Justices Stephen Breyer, Sonia Sotomayor, Elena Kagan, Brett Kavanaugh, and Amy Coney Barrett. The decision was made on narrow grounds beyond the scope of Smith. Roberts identified that the anti-discrimination clause in the city's foster care certification policy included an allowance for exceptions to be made by the Commissioner of Human Services. Roberts found that with this exception capability, the anti-discrimination clause failed via Smith, in that "where the State has in place a system of individual exemptions, it may not refuse to extend that system to cases of 'religious hardship' without compelling reason". Roberts wrote that the city's policy to deny contracting CSS due to their same-sex couple policy violated the Free Exercise Clause. Roberts concluded that "The City has burdened CSS's religious exercise through policies that do not satisfy the threshold requirement of being neutral and generally applicable", and thus ruled against the city. Roberts wrote "it is plain that the city's actions have burdened CSS's religious exercise by putting it to the choice of curtailing its mission or approving relationships inconsistent with its beliefs." Roberts wrote that foster care services do not fall as a public accommodation, and as such, the Court applied strict scrutiny review of the city's policies towards any potential discrimination.

Justice Barrett wrote a concurring opinion to which Justice Kavanaugh joined and Justice Breyer joined for all but the first paragraph. While Barrett wrote that "the textual and structural arguments against Smith...are compelling", she joined in the majority in the narrow opinion that did not evoke Smith, stating that "There would be a number of issues to work through if Smith were overruled."

Justice Samuel Alito wrote an opinion concurring in judgment, which was joined by Justices Clarence Thomas and Neil Gorsuch. Justice Gorsuch also wrote an opinion concurring in judgment, which Thomas and Alito joined. In both opinions, the Justices expressed concerns that the majority rationale for the judgment did not do enough to support religious freedoms and had left Smith in place. Alito called for the overturning of Smith and wrote in his opinion "The Court has emitted a wisp of a decision that leaves religious liberty in a confused and vulnerable state. Those who count on this Court to stand up for the First Amendment have every right to be disappointed – as am I." Alito opined that the Smith standard should be replaced with "the standard that Smith replaced: A law that imposes a substantial burden on religious exercise can be sustained only if it is narrowly tailored to serve a compelling government interest." In his concurrence, Alito also reiterated the history behind foster care as well as the role of religion, by describing the care of orphaned and abandoned children as “dat[ing] back to the earliest days of the Church.” Alito traced the history of religious involvement in the operation of orphanages and connected this history to our modern reliance on foster families. In Justice Alito’s telling, it is the modern same-sex rights that are interfering with the Catholic Church’s honorable long-standing tradition of caring for needy children. Gorsuch's opinion echoed Alito's call for overturning Smith, adding that the majority opinion had undertaken a "dizzying series of maneuvers" to arrive at their judgment.

== Subsequent developments ==
On July 28, 2021, the Third Circuit reversed the judgment of the district court, and remanded the case for further proceedings in light of the Supreme Court's opinion. On September 24, 2021, the District Court permanently enjoined the City from (1) refusing to contract with CSS unless they agree to certify same-sex and unmarried couples, (2) declining to refer foster children to CSS on the basis of CSS's religious exemption from certifying same-sex and unmarried couples as foster parents, and (3) declining to place foster children with any of the individual plaintiffs on the basis of CSS's religious exemption from certifying same-sex and unmarried couples as foster parents. The City was also ordered not to take any other adverse action under Pennsylvania law against CSS for its certification of prospective foster parents.

== Reactions ==
Prior to the Court's ruling, Fulton had been anticipated to be a landmark case in the conflict between freedom of religious expression and LGBT rights; with the Court's conservative majority, it had been expected that the decision would have been a significant victory for religious groups and a loss for LGBT supporters. Instead, the Court's decision was seen as narrowly focused that only gave a small victory for conservative religious groups, and bypassed larger questions that had been asked regarding the accommodations for LGBT by religion-based groups in governmental regulations. Mark Joseph Stern for Slate opined that Roberts had written the opinion in a narrow matter to minimize the impact on LGBT rights so as to bring the liberal members of the Court into joining with the majority.

Linda Greenhouse noted that the Smith rule was not applied because the policy allowed exceptions to Philadelphia's nondiscrimination policy and so it was not a generally applicable policy. Greenhouse says the case Church of Lukumi Babalu Aye, Inc. v. Hialeah requiring strict scrutiny analysis for laws that burden religious practice has been applied more expansively in recent cases. Richard Garnett of Notre Dame Law School said that the unanimous ruling reaffirming this trend in free exercise jurisprudence was "highly significant" and gained support from the Court's liberal wing. Adam Winkler said the decision was "definitely not a landmark case" but reflected the "importance of religious liberty in this Supreme Court". Ian Millhiser wrote in an article for Vox that the majority opinion was "exceedingly narrow" and was decided "on grounds that are unlikely to have many implications for future cases". The narrowness of the decision in Fulton was compared to the Court's approach in deciding Masterpiece Cakeshop v. Colorado Civil Rights Commission in 2018, where a baker refused to provide a custom-made cake for a gay couple's wedding and had faced action under the Colorado anti-discrimination laws; in Masterpiece, the Court similarly ruled on a narrow basis on the approach Colorado had taken in reprimanding the baker, rather than establish any landmark decision.

Philadelphia's City Solicitor Diana Cortes called the ruling a "difficult and disappointing setback" but was also gratified that the decision did not "radically change existing constitutional law to adopt a standard that would force court-ordered religious exemptions from civic obligations in every arena." Lori Windham, a lawyer at The Becket Fund for Religious Liberty, which represented CSS and other foster care groups in the case, called the Court's decision a "common-sense ruling in favor of religious social services". "It’s a beautiful day when the highest court in the land protects foster moms and the 200-year-old religious ministry that supports them", said Windham. Plaintiffs Sharronell Fulton and Toni Simms-Busch were both pleased with the ruling; Fulton stated "I am overjoyed that the Supreme Court recognized the import [sic] work of Catholic Social Services and has allowed me to continue fostering children most in need of a loving home", while Simms-Busch said "The Supreme Court’s decision ensures the most vulnerable children in the City of Brotherly Love have every opportunity to find loving homes."

Civil rights organizations that (also) focus on lesbian, gay, bisexual, and transgender (LGBT) people and communities reacted differently to the court's decision. Their reactions ranged from the emphasis upon the narrow grounds on which the decision rested to deep disappointment. The Supreme Court's decision was regarded as an infringement on the rights of LGBTQ parents by LGBTQ Nation. Ronald E. Richter, the CEO of New York City's largest foster care system, stated that the decision "to allow private agencies that receive tax dollars to provide government services to discriminate against LGBTQ+ families like mine is devastating for the human rights of people who identify as LGBTQ+". However, the ACLU LGBT + HIV Project, which helped to defend two agencies on behalf of the city, supported the ruling, stating that the Court denied "opponents of LGBTQ equality" the "constitutional right to opt out of [non-discrimination protections] when discrimination is motivated by religious beliefs".

Religious groups were also mixed on the decision. Progressive religious groups were generally disappointed by the decision, but some like the Americans United for Separation of Church & State commended the Court for maintaining a narrow decision. Conservative religious groups were generally more supportive of the Court's ruling, though they recognized the narrowness of the ruling. The Family Research Council called the ruling "a substantial win for religious liberty", and "In a time of growing hostility towards religion, the Supreme Court's reaffirmation of this fundamental freedom is even more critical." The Southern Baptist Convention stated that the ruling "prohibits no one from serving children" but "simply ends state discrimination against religious groups." American attorney Roger Severino who served as the director of the Office of Civil Rights (OCR) at the United States Department of Health and Human Services opined that "religious liberty won 9 votes" in a "nearly unbroken religious-freedom win streak now stretches back decades, essentially all the way to the Employment Division v. Smith decision from 1990 ... ."

== Scholarly Commentary ==
Fulton v. Philadelphia increased scrutiny over the involvement of religious groups in government-funded foster care programs. Professor Elizabeth D. Katz of the University of Florida Levin College of Law took note of the fact that Chief Justice's Robert's opinion heavily relied on a historical lens that emphasized the Catholic Church's extensive contributions in child welfare services. However, Professor Katz comments that this framing of private charitable organizations' participation as "well meaning" or "benign" fails to account for an extensive historical record demonstrating faith-based organizations' role in "repeatedly provok[ing] political controversy, stok[ing] interfaith hostility, and allow[ing] inadequate services . . . to children across religious, ethnic, and racial groups" to the detriment of children. In the wake of Fulton, understanding this fuller historical account is central to advocating thoughtful approaches to reforming the modern child welfare system, specifically as policymakers face mounting pressures to reassess the extent to which private foster care agencies, particularly those funded, in part, by government subsidies, can freely operate in accordance with their respective religious beliefs.
