= 2020 term per curiam opinions of the Supreme Court of the United States =

The Supreme Court of the United States handed down fourteen per curiam opinions during its 2020 term, which began October 5, 2020, and concluded October 3, 2021.

Because per curiam decisions are issued from the Court as an institution, these opinions all lack the attribution of authorship or joining votes to specific justices. All justices on the Court at the time the decision was handed down are assumed to have participated and concurred unless otherwise noted.

== Court membership ==
Chief Justice: John Roberts

Associate Justices: Clarence Thomas, Stephen Breyer, Samuel Alito, Sonia Sotomayor, Elena Kagan, Neil Gorsuch, Brett Kavanaugh, Amy Coney Barrett (confirmed October 26, 2020)

== Mckesson v. Doe ==
- Full caption: DeRay Mckesson v. John Doe
- Citations: 592 U.S. 1
- Full text of the opinion: official slip opinion · Justia

592 U.S. 1
Decided November 2, 2020.
Under the facts of this case, the state supreme court should resolve uncertain state tort law before federal courts decide whether applying that law would violate the First Amendment.

Fifth Circuit vacated and remanded.

Thomas dissented without separate opinion. Barrett did not participate in the consideration or decision of the case.

== Taylor v. Riojas ==
- Full caption: Trent Michael Taylor v. Robert Riojas, et al.
- Citations: 592 U.S. 7
- Full text of the opinion: official slip opinion · Cornell

592 U.S. 7
Decided November 2, 2020.
The officers were not entitled to qualified immunity; no reasonable correctional officer could have concluded that, under these extreme circumstances, it was constitutionally permissible to house Taylor in such deplorably unsanitary conditions for an extended period of time.

Fifth Circuit vacated and remanded.

Thomas dissented without separate opinion. Alito filed an opinion concurring in the judgment. Barrett did not participate in the consideration or decision of the case.

== Roman Catholic Diocese of Brooklyn v. Cuomo ==
- Full caption: Roman Catholic Diocese of Brooklyn, New York v. Andrew M. Cuomo, Governor Of New York
- Citations: 592 U.S. 14
- Full text of the opinion: official slip opinion · Oyez

592 U.S. 14
Decided November 25, 2020.
The stay applicants made a strong showing that the challenged restrictions violate "the minimum requirement of neutrality" to religion under Church of Lukumi Babalu Aye, Inc. v. Hialeah. The regulations limiting gatherings during the COVID lockdowns could not be viewed as neutral because they singled out houses of worship for more stringent restrictions.

Application for injunctive relief granted.

The Court ordered New York State enjoined from enforcing Executive Order 202.68 with respect to religious groups, pending appeals.

Consolidated with Agudath Israel of America, et al. v. Cuomo. Gorsuch and Kavanaugh filed concurrences. Roberts filed a dissent. Breyer filed a dissent, joined by Sotomayor and Kagan. Sotomayor filed a dissent, joined by Kagan.

== Shinn v. Kayer ==
- Full caption: David Shinn, Director, Arizona Department of Corrections v. George Russell Kayer
- Citations: 592 U.S. 111
- Full text of the opinion: official slip opinion · Oyez

592 U.S. 111
Decided December 14, 2020.
Under AEDPA, when a state court has applied clearly established federal law to reasonably determined facts in the process of adjudicating a claim on the merits, a federal habeas court may not disturb the state court's decision unless its error lies "beyond any possibility for fairminded disagreement." In this case, the Court of Appeals erred in ordering issuance of a writ of habeas corpus despite ample room for reasonable disagreement about the prisoner's ineffective-assistance-of-counsel claim.

Ninth Circuit vacated and remanded.

Breyer, Sotomayor, and Kagan dissented without separate opinion.

== Trump v. New York ==
- Full caption: Donald J. Trump, President of the United States, et al. v. State of New York, et al.
- Citations: 592 U.S. 125
- Full text of the opinion: official slip opinion · Oyez

592 U.S. 125
Argued November 30, 2020.
Decided December 18, 2020.
This case was premature due to lack of standing and ripeness.

District Court for the Southern District of New York vacated and remanded with instructions to dismiss for lack of jurisdiction.

Breyer filed a dissent, joined by Sotomayor and Kagan.

== Mays v. Hines ==
- Full caption: Tony Mays, Warden v. Anthony Darrell Dugard Hines
- Citations: 592 U.S. 385
- Prior history: Petition denied, Hines v. Carpenter, No. 05–00002 (M.D. Tenn. Mar. 16, 2015); rev'd, sub nom. Hines v. Mays, 814 Fed. Appx. 898 (6th Cir. 2020)
- Laws applied: U.S. Const. amend. VI
- Full text of the opinion: official slip opinion · Cornell

592 U.S. 385
Decided March 29, 2021.
A Tennessee jury found Anthony Hines guilty of murdering Katherine Jenkins at a motel. Witnesses saw Hines fleeing in the victim's car and wearing a bloody shirt, and his family members heard him admit to stabbing someone at the motel. 35 years later, the Sixth Circuit held that Hines was entitled to a new trial and sentence because his attorney should have tried harder to blame another man. In reaching its conclusion, the Sixth Circuit "disregarded the overwhelming evidence of guilt" that supported the contrary conclusion of a Tennessee court. This approach violated Congress' prohibition in AEDPA of disturbing state-court judgments on federal habeas review absent an error that lies beyond any possibility for fair-minded disagreement.

Sixth Circuit reversed.

Sotomayor dissented without separate opinion.

== Tandon v. Newsom ==
- Full caption: Ritesh Tandon, et al. v. Gavin Newsom, Governor of California, et al.
- Citations: 593 U.S. 61
- Prior history: Injunction denied, 2021 WL 1185157 (9th Cir. 2021)
- Laws applied: U.S. Const. amend. I
- Full text of the opinion: official slip opinion · Findlaw

593 U.S. 61
Decided April 9, 2021.
Government regulations are not neutral and generally applicable, and therefore trigger strict scrutiny under the Free Exercise Clause, whenever they treat any comparable secular activity more favorably than religious exercise.

Application for injunctive relief granted.

Roberts noted without separate opinion that he would deny the application. Kagan filed a dissent, joined by Breyer and Sotomayor.

== Alaska v. Wright ==
- Full caption: Alaska v. Sean Wright
- Citations: 593 U.S. 152
- Prior history: Petition denied, D. Alaska rev'd, 819 Fed. Appx. 544 (9th Cir. 2020)
- Full text of the opinion: official slip opinion · Cornell

593 U.S. 152
Decided April 26, 2021.
The requirement under AEDPA that a habeas petitioner be "in custody pursuant to the judgment of a State court" is not met if the state judgment is simply a necessary predicate to a federal conviction.

Ninth Circuit vacated and remanded.

== Lombardo v. St. Louis ==
- Full caption: Jody Lombardo, et al. v. City of St. Louis, Missouri, et al.
- Citations: 594 U.S. 464
- Full text of the opinion: official slip opinion · Cornell

594 U.S. 464
Decided June 28, 2021.
The Supreme Court said it was unclear whether the Eighth Circuit incorrectly thought the use of a prone restraint is per se constitutional so long as an individual appears to resist officers' efforts to subdue him. The case was remanded to give the lower court the opportunity in the first instance to employ the context-specific analysis required by Supreme Court excessive-force precedent.

Eighth Circuit vacated and remanded.

Alito filed a dissent, joined by Thomas and Gorsuch.

== Pakdel v. City and County of San Francisco ==
- Full caption: Peyman Pakdel, et ux. v. City and County of San Francisco, California, et al.
- Citations: 594 U.S. 474
- Full text of the opinion: official slip opinion · Cornell

594 U.S. 474
Decided June 28, 2021.
Plaintiffs do not need to perform administrative exhaustion of state remedies to file a Section 1983 takings claim when the state has reached a conclusive position.

Ninth Circuit vacated and remanded.

== Dunn v. Reeves ==
- Full caption: Jefferson S. Dunn, Commissioner, Alabama Department of Corrections v. Matthew Reeves
- Citations: 594 U.S. 731
- Full text of the opinion: official slip opinion · Cornell

594 U.S. 731
Decided July 2, 2021.
Willie Johnson towed Matthew Reeves' broken-down car back to the city after finding Reeves stranded on an Alabama dirt road. Reeves murdered Johnson. After being convicted of murder and sentenced to death, Reeves sought state post-conviction relief, arguing that his trial counsel should have hired an expert to develop sentencing-phase mitigation evidence of intellectual disability. Reeves had the burden to rebut the strong presumption that his attorneys made a legitimate strategic choice. Reeves did not call any of them to testify. The Alabama Court of Criminal Appeals denied relief, stressing that lack of evidence about counsel's decisions impeded Reeves' efforts to prove that they acted unreasonably.

On federal habeas review, the Eleventh Circuit held that this analysis was not only wrong but indefensible. The Eleventh Circuit interpreted the Alabama court's opinion as imposing a per se prohibition on relief in all cases where a prisoner fails to question his counsel.

When the case reached the Supreme court, it said that federal habeas courts must defer to reasonable state-court decisions. Moreover, it said that the Alabama court's treatment of the spotty record in this case was consistent with the Supreme Court's recognition in Burt v. Titlow that "the absence of evidence cannot overcome the strong presumption that counsel's conduct fell within the wide range of reasonable professional assistance."

Eleventh Circuit reversed and remanded.

Breyer dissented without separate opinion. Sotomayor filed a dissent, joined by Kagan.

== Alabama Assn. of Realtors v. Department of Health and Human Servs. ==
- Full caption: Alabama Association of Realtors, et al. v. Department of Health and Human Services, et al.
- Citations: 594 U.S. 758
- Full text of the opinion: official slip opinion · Findlaw

594 U.S. 758
Decided August 26, 2021.
In March 2020, Congress passed the CARES Act, which was designed to provide various forms of aid to people impacted by the COVID-19 pandemic. One provision of the Act was a 120-day moratorium on evictions from properties that participated in federal assistance programs or were subject to federally backed loans. When the moratorium expired in July, Congress chose not to renew it statutorily. Instead, the Director of the CDC administratively imposed a new moratorium that barred evictions from all properties and levied criminal penalties on property owners that violated it. The administrative moratorium was originally scheduled to expire on December 31, 2020, but as part of the Consolidated Appropriations Act, 2021, Congress renewed it until January 31, 2021. Before the new statutory deadline passed, the CDC moved again to administratively extend it - first through March, then through June, and finally through July 2021.

In May 2021, the Alabama Association of Realtors sued, alleging that the CDC lacked the authority to extend the moratorium. The District Court granted summary judgement in favor of the realtors, but stayed its order pending appeal. The realtors appealed the stay in June, and the Supreme Court declined to vacate it. Justices Thomas, Alito, Gorsuch, and Barrett noted that they would have vacated the stay, while Justice Kavanaugh wrote that due to the moratorium expiring in only a few weeks, he voted to allow the stay to continue, but that "clear and specific congressional authorization" would be required for the CDC to extend the moratorium beyond July 31. On August 3, 2021, the CDC Director imposed a new moratorium. The realtors returned to court to seek vacatur of the stay. The District Court noted that the four dissenting votes in addition to Justice Kavanaugh's statement meant that the realtors were now likely to succeed on the merits if the case proceeded to the Supreme Court. However, the District Court concluded that its hands were tied by the precedent against vacating the stay. The realtors again appealed to the Supreme Court, which vacated the stay and ended the eviction moratorium.

Justice Breyer filed a dissenting opinion, which was joined by Justices Sotomayor and Kagan. In it, he argued that the realtors were not as likely to succeed on the merits as the majority claimed, and thus the moratorium should have been stayed while litigation proceeded.

== See also ==
- List of United States Supreme Court cases, volume 592
- List of United States Supreme Court cases, volume 593
- List of United States Supreme Court cases, volume 594
