= Americans for Prosperity Foundation v. Bonta =

- Supreme Court of the United States

Argued April 26, 2021 Decided July 1, 2021
- Full case name: Americans for Prosperity Foundation v. Rob Bonta, Attorney General of California; Thomas More Law Center v. Rob Bonta, Attorney General of California
- Docket nos.: 19-251; 19-255
- Citations: 594 U.S. ___ (more) 141 S.Ct. 2373
- Argument: Oral argument

Holding
- The requirement for non-profit organizations to disclose their donors under California law is facially invalid because it burdens the First Amendment rights of the donors and it is not also narrowly tailored to an important interest of government.

Court membership
- Chief Justice John Roberts Associate Justices Clarence Thomas · Stephen Breyer; Samuel Alito · Sonia Sotomayor; Elena Kagan · Neil Gorsuch; Brett Kavanaugh · Amy Coney Barrett

Case opinions
- Majority: Roberts (except as to Part II–B–1), joined by Alito, Gorsuch, Kavanaugh, Barrett; Thomas (except Parts II–B–1 and III–B)
- Plurality: Roberts (Part II–B–1), joined by Kavanaugh, Barrett
- Concurrence: Thomas (in part and in the judgment)
- Concurrence: Alito (in part and in the judgment), joined by Gorsuch
- Dissent: Sotomayor, joined by Breyer, Kagan

Laws applied
- U.S. Const. amend. I

Americans for Prosperity Foundation v. Bonta, 141 S.Ct. 2373 (2021), is a United States Supreme Court case dealing with the disclosure of donors to non-profit organizations. The case challenged California's requirement that non-profit organizations disclose the identity of their donors to the state's Attorney General as a precondition of soliciting donations in the state. The case was consolidated with Thomas More Law Center v. Bonta. In July 2021, the Supreme Court ruled in a 6–3 decision that California's requirement burdened the donors' First Amendment rights, was not narrowly tailored, and was constitutionally invalid.

== Background ==
Under federal law, non-profit organizations are required to provide the Internal Revenue Service (IRS) with a list of major donors (those that donate more than $5,000 or 2% of the total donations to the non-profit in a year) with their annual tax forms, Form 990. This information, held on Schedule B "Schedule of Contributors" of Form 990, is treated as sensitive within the IRS and not shared with states unless there is a pressing need. While non-profits are required to make Form 990 publicly available, they are not required to include the Schedule B donor information. This was established by Congress to protect the privacy of donors to non-profits.

Within California, non-profits must renew their registration with the state annually via the state's attorney general's office. Though no state statute required it, in 2010 the state began requiring non-profits to include the Form 990 Schedule B with their registration, or be decertified in the state. While many non-profits complied, others argued that this was unconstitutional. Unlike the federal filings, the California filings served no tax purpose. Further, California lacked the protections against accidental disclosure—including penalties for publicly disclosing the information—that applied to the IRS. While the state gave assurances that these forms would be held in confidence, during litigation it was found where over 1,800 forms were posted online for public access, while others were included in material that was taken during a computer hack.

== Lower courts ==
Two of the non-profits affected, Americans for Prosperity and the Thomas More Law Center, filed suit against attorney general Kamala Harris in 2014 in the Central District of California. (Over the course of the litigation, the defendant shifted as the state Attorney General's office changed hands, from Harris to Xavier Becerra (AG from 2017 to 2021), to Matthew Rodriquez (acting AG in 2021), to Rob Bonta). The two non-profits argued that the California regulation on disclosure violated their freedom of association under the First Amendment and would scare away donors who otherwise wished to remain anonymous. The District Court granted a permanent injunction to prevent the state from collecting Schedule B from non-profits in a ruling in April 2016.

The state appealed the injunction to the Ninth Circuit. There, the Ninth Circuit reversed the District Court ruling and lifted the injunction. The three-judge panel of the Ninth Circuit ruled that there was a compelling state interest to have the donor lists from the Schedule B form to police charitable fraud. The Ninth Circuit rejected a motion to hear the case en banc.

== Supreme Court ==
Both Americans for Prosperity and the Thomas More Law Center separately petitioned to the Supreme Court to challenge the Ninth Circuit's decision. Both petitioners argued that strict scrutiny—the Supreme Court's most demanding standard of review—should apply in evaluating whether their freedom of speech and association rights could be infringed by the needs of the state. The petitioners referenced the Court's decisions in NAACP v. Alabama (1958) and Bates v. City of Little Rock (1960), which found that states could not demand donor lists or other private information from non-profits to make determinations about the nature of their business if there were other non-intrusive methods available to the state. The petitions further argued that California's request for Schedule B was far broader than necessary for its purported need to fight fraud, which would also result in the state's rule failing the strict scrutiny test. Petitioners further argued that even if the less demanding exacting scrutiny test were applied, the California requirement was overly broad and hence unconstitutional.

In response, California urged the Court to review the case under the lower standard of exacting scrutiny. The State argued that the request for all Schedule B's was necessarily broad so that it could review records when complaints are filed against charities, and generally to police fraud. The state also asserted that there was no evidence from the petitioners that showed that this disclosure of the donors lists had slowed down or scared off potential donors to non-profits. The state claimed the public disclosure of thousands of Schedule B forms were practical failures but should not affect the overall constitutionality of the policy.

In amicus briefs prior to the Court's certification, hundreds of non-profits wrote to support the petitioners' case. Those in support of California, including Democratic Senators, argued that upholding the Ninth Circuit decision was necessary to prevent the increased use of political "dark money" donated through non-profits.

The Court certified both cases in January 2021, consolidating them under Americans for Prosperity's petition. Prior to oral arguments, several groups petitioned for Justice Amy Coney Barrett to recuse herself from the case, as Americans for Prosperity had spent significant funds for an ad campaign to promote her as the replacement justice for Justice Ruth Bader Ginsburg. Barrett refused to recuse herself without comment.

The Court heard oral arguments on April 26, 2021, and issued its decision on July 1, 2021. The 6–3 decision reversed the Ninth Circuit's ruling and remanded the case to enter judgment in accordance with the Supreme Court's opinion. The majority opinion, written by Chief Justice John Roberts and joined by Justices Clarence Thomas, Samuel Alito, Neil Gorsuch, Brett Kavanaugh, and Amy Coney Barrett, ruled that California's regulation violated the First Amendment rights of donors and non-profits, did not serve a narrowly tailored government interest, and thus was invalid. Roberts wrote "The upshot is that California casts a dragnet for sensitive donor information from tens of thousands of charities each year, even though that information will become relevant in only a small number of cases involving filed complaints."

Justice Sonia Sotomayor authored a dissent, which Justices Stephen Breyer and Elena Kagan joined. Sotomayor wrote that the majority decision would open up more anonymous money into political donations, and that their evaluation of California's regulation "trades precision for blunt force" and creates a "significant risk that it will topple disclosure regimes that should be constitutional."

Although the case was widely cited in the media as a conservative victory, the American Civil Liberties Union, NAACP Legal Defense and Educational Fund, and the Human Rights Campaign were among the non-profits filing or signing on to amicus briefs in support of Americans for Prosperity Foundation.
