= Kenealy =

Kenealy is a surname. Notable people with the surname include:

- Amy Kenealy (born 1988), Irish cricketer
- Arabella Kenealy (1859–1938), British writer, daughter of Edward Kenealy
- Don Kenealy, New Zealand rugby league player
- Edward Kenealy (1819–1880), Irish barrister and writer
- Kathleen Kenealy, American attorney and politician
- Robyn E. Kenealy (born 1983), New Zealand comic book artist
- Suzanne Kenealy (born 1981), Irish cricketer
- William Kenealy (1886–1915), Irish World War I soldier
