= California's 18th district =

California's 18th district may refer to:

- California's 18th congressional district
- California's 18th State Assembly district
- California's 18th State Senate district
