= Owen Wade =

Owen Wade may refer to:

- Owen Wade (physician)
- Owen Wade (politician)
