= John C. Lynch =

American politician

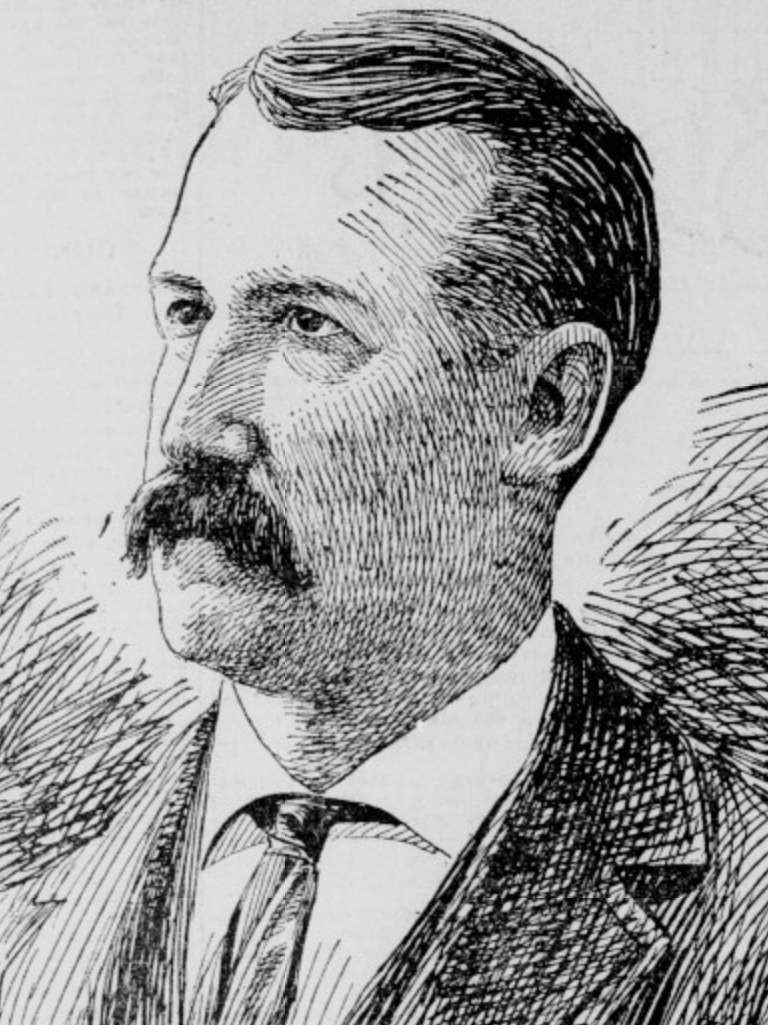
- Lynch in 1897

30th Speaker of the California State Assembly
- In office January 1895 – March 1895
- Preceded by: Frank H. Gould
- Succeeded by: Frank Leslie Coombs

Member of the California State Assembly
- In office 1893–1897
- Preceded by: A. Guy Smith
- Succeeded by: T. H. Goff
- Constituency: 78th district
- In office 1891–1893
- Preceded by: Elmer W. Holmes
- Succeeded by: William H. Carlson
- Constituency: 79th district

Personal details
- Born: November 23, 1851 Ashland, Ohio, U.S.
- Died: November 28, 1941 (aged 90) San Francisco, California, U.S.
- Party: Republican
- Spouse: Mary Fowler
- Education: Oberlin College; Tulane University; University of Chicago

Military service
- Allegiance: Illinois National Guard
- Rank: Sergeant

John Conant Lynch (November 23, 1851 – November 28, 1941) was an American lawyer, manager, and Republican politician, who is best known for serving as Speaker of the California State Assembly in 1895.

== Early life and career ==
Lynch was born on November 23, 1851, in Ashland, Ohio. His father was an immigrant from Ireland who fought for the Ohio State Militia during the American Civil War. Lynch attended the University of Louisiana (now Tulane University) and received a Juris Doctor degree from the University of Chicago. He was assistant State Engineer of Louisiana and resident engineer for the Texas and Pacific Railway before he was admitted to the bar in 1875. He was secretary to the Bureau of Awards at the 1876 Centennial Exposition in Philadelphia, and served as a manager of the Twin City Gas Company in LaSalle, Illinois. During his time in Illinois, he was a member of the Illinois National Guard, rising to the rank of Sergeant.

He moved to California in 1883 and worked for his father's law practice in Benicia before he helped organize the Cucamonga Fruit Land Company of San Bernardino County in 1886. He was vice president and a general manager of the company and was part of a land development project which involved 65,000 acres of land having infrastructure such as roads and irrigation pipelines built on it, before being subdivided and sold.

== Political career ==
An active Republican, Lynch represented his party at various state and county conventions. He was elected to the California State Assembly in 1890 from the 79th district, he was re-elected to the Assembly in 1892, having been redistricted to the 78th district, serving until 1897. Between January and March 1895, he served as Speaker of the Assembly.

During his tenure in the state legislature, he was an ex-officio member of the University of California Board of Regents for two years.

== Later career ==
Between 1907 and 1908, Lynch served as a state bank examiner, and eventually moved to Alaska where he was treasurer of the Alaska Treasure Mining Company and receiver for the Pacific Coast Casualty Company after 1916.

Preceded by Frank H. Gould	Speaker of the California State Assembly; January 1895 – March 1895	Succeeded by Frank Leslie Coombs
