= Mia Bonta =

American politician (born 1972)

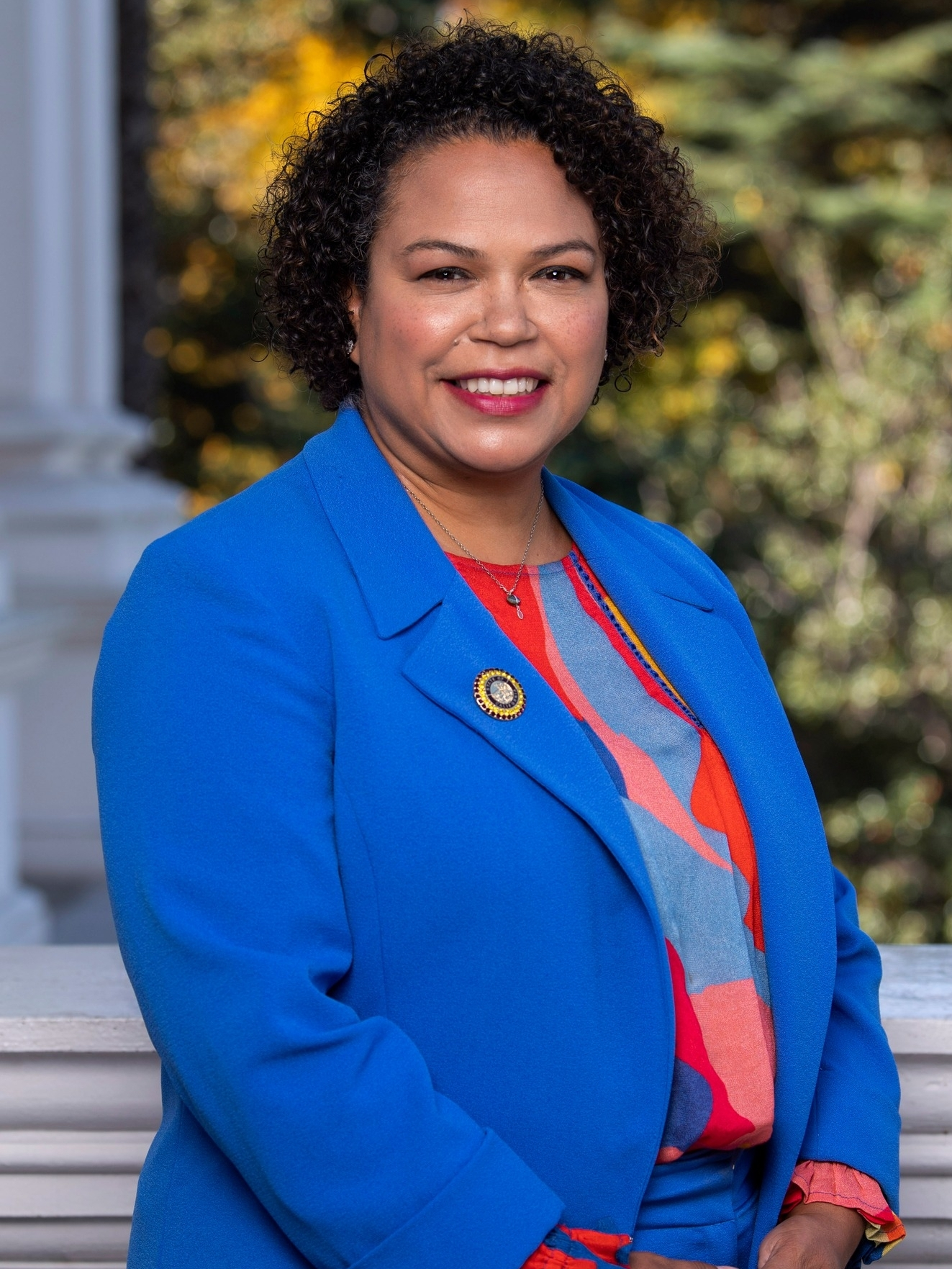
- Official portrait, 2022

Member of the California State Assembly from the 18th district
- Incumbent
- Assumed office September 7, 2021
- Preceded by: Rob Bonta

Personal details
- Born: Mialisa Tania Villafañe; January 26, 1972 (age 54) New York City, U.S.
- Party: Democratic
- Spouse: Rob Bonta (m. 1997)
- Children: 3, including Reina
- Education: Yale University (BA, JD); Harvard University (MEd)
- Website: State assembly website Campaign website

Mialisa Tania Bonta (née Villafañe; born January 26, 1972) is an American politician serving as a member of the California State Assembly. A member of the Democratic Party, she represents the 18th Assembly District, which consists of Alameda, Emeryville, and most of Oakland.

== Early life and education ==
Bonta was born in New York City to Puerto Rican parents. Some of her ancestors came to Puerto Rico from Ghana via the Atlantic slave trade. She is the daughter of a divorced working mother in the Bronx. She attended Yale University, where she met her future husband Rob Bonta as a freshman. Bonta earned a Master of Education degree from the Harvard Graduate School of Education before attending Yale Law School with Rob Bonta.

== Career ==
Mia Bonta is the CEO of Oakland Promise, a nonprofit cradle-to-college support program focused on the city's low-income students. In 2018, she was elected to the Alameda School Board. In 2021, she was elected as a member of the California State Assembly from the 18th district, succeeding her husband Rob Bonta.

During her special election campaigns, Bonta's opponents claimed that she benefited from her husband's position and name, and pointed to money she has received from gambling interests that may be intended to influence Rob Bonta. In the primary, Bonta finished first place with 38% of the vote, and in the runoff, she defeated human rights attorney Janani Ramachandran by 56% to 44%.

Bonta is a member of the California Legislative Progressive Caucus, the California Legislative Black Caucus, the California Legislative Women's Caucus, and the California State Bay Area Caucus.

== Personal life ==
She has three children with her husband, Rob Bonta. Their daughter, Reina, is a filmmaker and plays soccer for Brazilian club Santos FC and the Philippines national team.

== Electoral history ==
=== Alameda School Board ===
2018 Alameda School Board election
Candidate	Votes	%
Mia Bonta	17,237	35.7
Gary Lym	12,674	26.2
Anne McKereghan	9,327	19.3
Kevin Jordan	8,856	18.3
Write-in	211	0.4
Total votes	48,305	100.0

=== California State Assembly ===
2021 California State Assembly 18th district special election Vacancy resulting from the resignation of Rob Bonta
Primary election
Party	Candidate	Votes	%
Democratic	Mia Bonta	22,558	38.0
Democratic	Janani Ramachandran	14,036	23.7
Democratic	Malia Vella	10,053	16.9
Republican	Stephen Slauson	5,725	9.6
Democratic	Victor Aguilar	3,938	6.6
Democratic	James Aguilar	1,039	1.8
Democratic	Eugene Canson	1,029	1.7
No party preference	Joel Britton	750	1.3
Total votes		59,128	100.0
General election
Democratic	Mia Bonta	43,460	56.8
Democratic	Janani Ramachandran	33,012	43.2
Total votes		76,472	100.0
Democratic hold			

2022 California State Assembly 18th district election
Primary election
Party	Candidate	Votes	%
Democratic	Mia Bonta (incumbent)	69,142	100.0
Republican	Mindy Pechenuk (write-in)	31	0.0
Total votes		69,173	100.0
General election
Democratic	Mia Bonta (incumbent)	120,863	89.9
Republican	Mindy Pechenuk	13,504	10.1
Total votes		134,367	100.0
Democratic hold			

2024 California State Assembly 18th district election
Primary election
Party	Candidate	Votes	%
Democratic	Mia Bonta (incumbent)	73,155	84.9
American Independent	Andre Sandford	4,582	5.3
Republican	Mindy Pechenuk	4,397	5.1
Republican	Cheyenne Kenney	4,012	4.7
Total votes		86,146	100.0
General election
Democratic	Mia Bonta (incumbent)	134,073	80.3
American Independent	Andre Sandford	32,983	19.7
Total votes		167,056	100.0
Democratic hold			
