= Mary Hayashi =

American politician

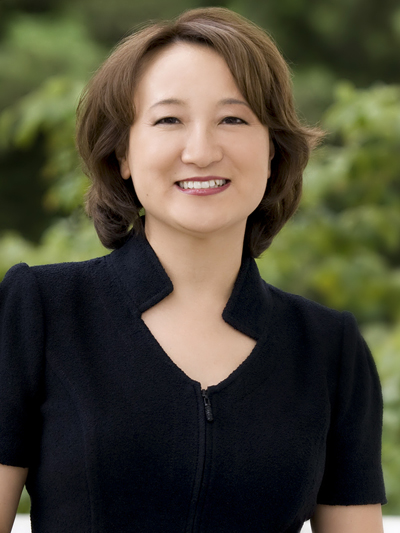
- Official portrait, 2009

Member of the California State Assembly from the 18th district
- In office December 4, 2006 – November 30, 2012
- Preceded by: Johan Klehs
- Succeeded by: Rob Bonta

Personal details
- Born: Mary Chung; August 13, 1967 (age 59) Gwangju, South Korea
- Party: Democratic
- Spouse: Dennis Hayashi
- Education: University of San Francisco (BS); Golden Gate University (MBA)
- Profession: California Director, American Public Health Association

Mary Hayashi (née Chung; August 13, 1967) is a Korean-American healthcare advocate and California Democratic politician, who represented 18th Assembly District in the California State Legislature. Hayashi was elected to the California State Assembly in November 2006 and served six years.

She served as a member of the leadership team for Assembly Speaker John Pérez, Assembly Speaker Karen Bass and Assembly Speaker Fabian Nunez, serving as Chair of the Assembly Committee on Business, Professions and Consumer Protection. Previously, Hayashi served as a member of the California Board of Registered Nursing and Commissioner on the California Mental Health Services Oversight and Accountability Commission, which was created to monitor the implementation of California Proposition 63 (2004). Hayashi ran unsuccessfully for California State Senate in 2014 finishing third place in the race.

== Early life and career ==
Prior to serving in the California State Legislature, Hayashi served as the Alameda County Coordinator in the winning campaign to pass California Proposition 63 (2004), which provides increased funding for prevention and treatment services in county and statewide mental health programs.

Hayashi served as a Commissioner on the California Mental Health Services Oversight and Accountability Commission, which was created to monitor the implementation of California Proposition 63 (2004). She is also a member of the executive committee for the National Action Alliance for Suicide Prevention, a public-private partnership that helps guide the implementation of the goals and objectives of the National Strategy for Suicide Prevention.

Hayashi has worked for several non-profit and philanthropic organizations dedicated to healthcare issues including the American Public Health Association, the Foundation Consortium for California's Children and Youth, and the National Asian Women's Health Organization. In 2016 Mary Hayashi was appointed Project Director of the Women's Sport Safety Initiative, a special project fund of Silicon Valley Community Foundation dedicated to protecting the lives of women and girls by raising awareness of sports-related injuries.

Hayashi served as a member of the California Board of Registered Nursing and as Chair of the Planned Parenthood Golden Gate Political Action Committee. She was a board member of the National Breast Cancer Coalition and Research!America, which successfully doubled the federal budget for the National Institutes of Health. She is a former board member of Girls Inc of Alameda County, and served as the honorary chair for their "Strong, Smart and Bold" annual luncheon.

Hayashi's journey from her childhood in Korea to prominence as a health care leader is documented in her book, Far from Home: Shattering the Myth of the Model Minority.

She has been honored by diverse organizations for her work on behalf of minority health and women, from Redbook Magazine and Ladies' Home Journal, to Planned Parenthood Affiliates of California and the Didi Hirsch Community Mental Health Center.

She was named Legislator of the Year by the California Medical Association and the American Red Cross. She also received the Distinguished Public Service Award from the Alameda County Democratic Lawyers Club. She earned her Bachelor of Science degree in Applied Economics from the University of San Francisco and her Master in Business Administration degree from Golden Gate University. She lives in Hayward, California with her husband Dennis Hayashi, a judge with the Alameda County Superior Court.

Hayashi unsuccessfully ran for Alameda County Board of Supervisors seat 2 in 2012. She came in third after Richard Valle and Union City Mayor Mark Green.

== California State Assembly ==
In the Legislature, Mary authored a number of bills focused on health and education reform. Among her bills that have been signed into law is AB 25, a concussion safety bill that placed California alongside Washington as the states with the toughest return-to-play laws for student athletes.

She authored AB 108, prohibiting health plans and insurers from rescinding an individual health insurance policy, protecting consumers from losing their health care coverage during the times they need it most. In addition, she authored AB 235, a mental health parity bill that requires insurers to cover treatment for psychiatric emergencies without prior authorization, and AB 509, which served as the catalyst for establishing California's first Office of Suicide Prevention. She has also championed public education, authoring AB 142 to help increase funding for schools through changes to the California State Lottery.

== Legal issues ==
In late October 2011, Hayashi was charged with theft after being caught shoplifting $2,445 worth of merchandise from San Francisco's Neiman Marcus store. She denied that she was responsible for the shoplifting incident, citing a medical condition and distraction. Hayashi subsequently pleaded no contest to a charge of misdemeanor grand theft, and was sentenced to a $180 fine and three years' probation.

== Campaigns ==
In February 2014, Hayashi announced her candidacy in the 2014 Democratic primary election for the California State Senate, in the 10th District. On June 3, 2014, Hayashi placed third in the District 10 blanket primary behind Democrat Bob Wieckowski and Republican Peter Kuo, with Wieckowski later defeating Kuo in the runoff election on November 4.
