= Frank H. Gould =

American politician

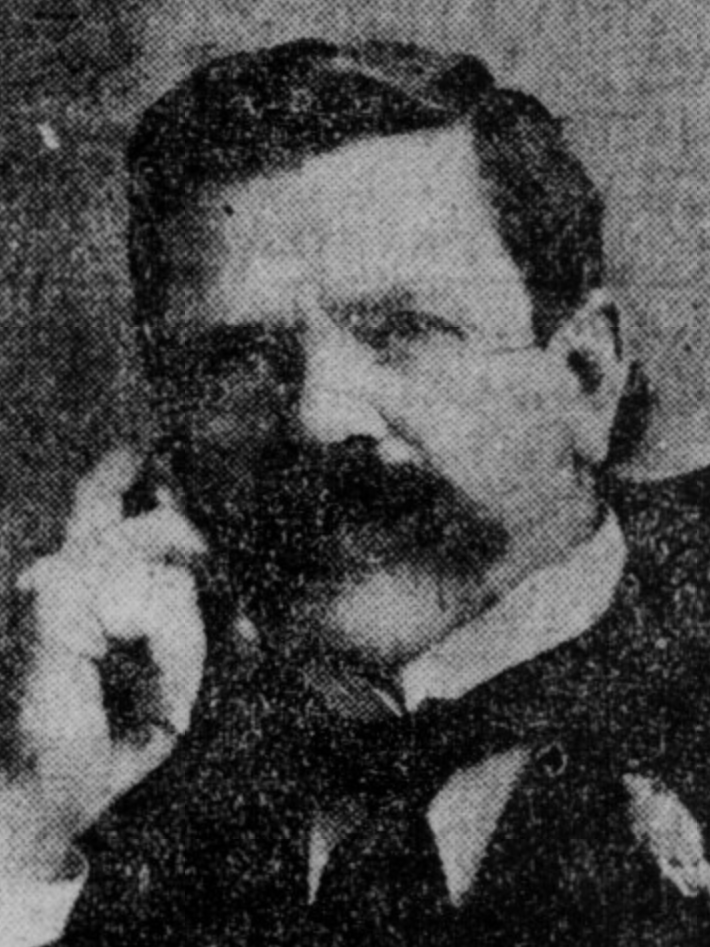

29th Speaker of the California State Assembly
- In office January 1893–March 1893
- Preceded by: Frank Leslie Coombs
- Succeeded by: John C. Lynch

Member of the California State Assembly
- In office January 2, 1893 – January 7, 1895
- Preceded by: George E. Carter
- Succeeded by: Lovell Alexander Richards
- Constituency: 57th district
- In office January 5, 1891 – January 2, 1893
- Preceded by: William M. Rundell
- Succeeded by: Charles A. Barlow
- Constituency: 67th district

Personal details
- Born: August 29, 1855 Fayette County, Iowa, U.S.
- Died: February 1, 1918 (aged 62) San Francisco, California, U.S.
- Party: Democratic
- Spouse(s): M. A. Eaton (m. 1897) Nettie Gould (div. 1918)
- Children: 4
- Education: San Jose State University; Alabama State University
- Other offices: County surveyor of Mariposa County; 1894-1896: Chairman of the California Democratic State Central Committee

Frank H. Gould (August 29, 1855 – February 1, 1918) was a Democratic politician from California who served in the California State Assembly from 1891 to 1895 and served as its Speaker in 1893. Gould was also the Chair of the California Democratic State Central Committee.

== Life and career ==
Gould was born in 1855 in Iowa and moved to California with his parents at the age of two, growing up in Santa Clara County. He attended the State Normal School in San Jose (now known as San Jose State University), and later studied law at Alabama State University before being admitted to the bar in California in 1887. Gould served as the county surveyor of Mariposa County before he was elected to the California State Assembly from the 67th district representing Merced and Mariposa counties. He was later redistricted to the 57th district after 1893. Between January and March of 1893, Gould served as Speaker of the Assembly. While in the Assembly, Gould was an ex-officio member of the Board of Regents of the University of California.

Gould was later Chair of the California Democratic State Central Committee between 1894 and 1896 and was the director of Agnews State Hospital between 1894 and 1900. He also served on the State Building and Loan Commission between 1897 and 1901.

Preceded by Frank Leslie Coombs	Speaker of the California State Assembly; January 1893–March 1893	Succeeded by John C. Lynch
