= Leticia Quezada =

Mexican-American politician (born 1953)

Leticia Quezada (born July 12, 1953) is a Mexican-American politician and educator. She was the first Latina member of the Los Angeles Unified School District Board, later becoming President of the Board of Education, and is known for her advocacy of bilingual education and non-citizen voting.

== Early life and career ==
Quezada was born in Chihuahua, Mexico, where her father was a copper miner, and grew up in Ciudad Juárez. She immigrated to Pittsburg, California, as a teenager after the death of her father from tuberculosis. She struggled in a school district that did not make a strong effort to help her transition from a solely Spanish-speaking school into an English-speaking one.

Quezada pursued her bachelor's degree in psychology at the University of California, Santa Cruz, graduating in 1975 with honors, and received her master's from Cal State Sacramento. Despite earning a teaching credential, she was unable to get a job as a teacher in the Los Angeles school district, as the district did not consider her specialty, bilingual education, to be needed.

Before joining the school board she worked for the Chicana Service Action Center in Los Angeles and as a community relations manager for the Carnation Company. She also served as president of the Comisión Femenil Mexicana Nacional in 1981, chaired Los Angeles County Californios for Fair Representation, and worked as a coordinator and delegate for the 1984 presidential campaign of Walter Mondale.

== School Board service ==
In 1985, the trustees of the Los Angeles Community College District appointed Quezada to its board, after another member resigned to become City Controller. Although another Latino, J. William Orozco, had previously served on the board, Quezada became its first Latina. She left the board again in 1987, when she secured a seat on the Los Angeles Unified School District Board, becoming its first Latina.

As a LAUSD board member, Quezada pushed for an improved bilingual education program, increased parent control in local education, year-round schooling, and allowing non-citizen parents to vote in school board elections. During her time on the board, Quezada opposed lowering academic standards for student athletes and served as a strong advocate for Latinos and immigrants in lower socioeconomic classes.

During Quezada's first year in office, "The Master Plan" was adopted into the school district. The plan called for an increase in the number of bilingual teachers and teacher training plans for bilingual assistants to eventually become teachers. In addition to being a voice for "The Master Plan," Quezada also advocated for a $5,000 salary incentive for bilingual teachers and college programs for bilingual teachers in training.

In 1992, Quezada was elected as the President of the Board of Education, and was the first Latina to hold that position. As president, she recruited teachers from Mexico to make up for a shortage of bilingual teachers. She led the board through some of its most chaotic years, which included a battle against state school vouchers (Proposition 174), teacher strikes, attempts to break up the district, a controversial redistricting effort that ensured greater Latino representation on the board at the expense of the San Fernando Valley, and $700 million in damage to district facilities caused by the 1994 Northridge earthquake. Two years after her election to president, Quezada announced that she would step down from the school board. Her departure coincided with the passage of Proposition 187, which forced public schools to bar undocumented children.

== Later work ==
In 1992, Quezada ran for a seat in the United States House of Representatives, for California's 30th congressional district, but she lost in the primary to Xavier Becerra. Her campaign had been hurt by losing the support of United Teachers Los Angeles, the local teachers union which was unhappy with her over a contract dispute. From 1995 until 2002 Quezada was the director of the Mexican Cultural Institute of Los Angeles. In 2003 she joined California State University, San Bernardino as the program manager for the Osher Lifelong Learning Institute in Palm Desert, and in 2008 she became the university's interim director of extension programs in their College of Extended Learning.
