= Frank Coombs (politician) =

American lawyer and politician (1853–1934)

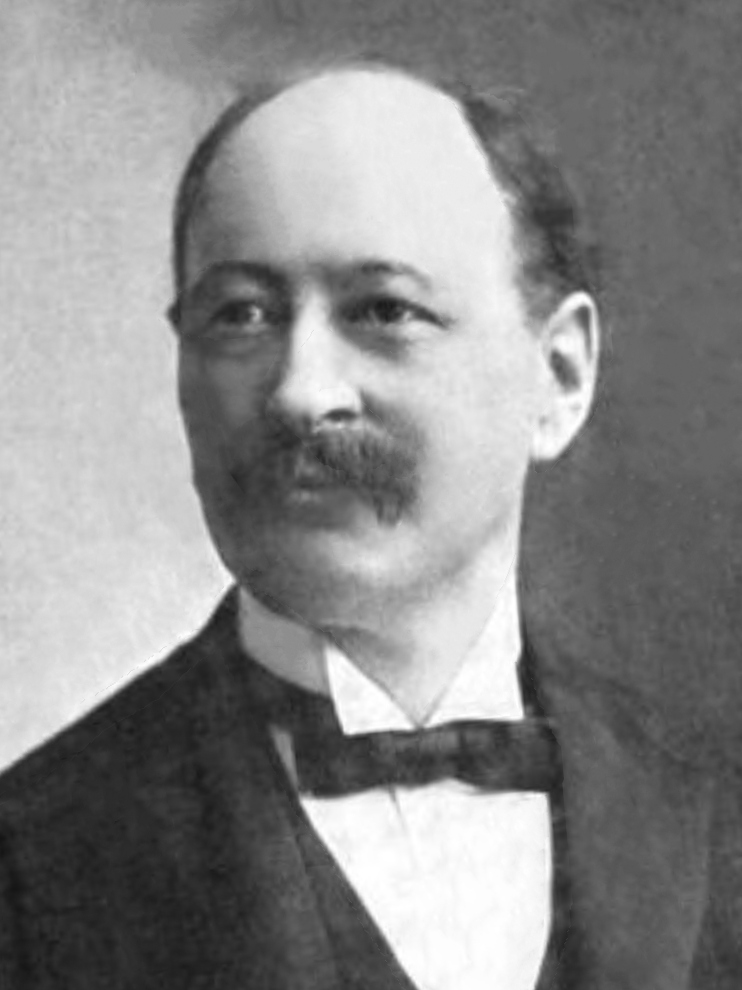

Member of the U.S. House of Representatives from California's 1st district
- In office March 4, 1901 – March 3, 1903
- Preceded by: John All Barham
- Succeeded by: James Gillett

United States Attorney for the Northern District of California
- In office April 1, 1899 – March 4, 1901
- President: William McKinley
- Preceded by: Henry S. Foote
- Succeeded by: Marshall B. Woodworth

United States Minister to Japan
- In office June 13, 1892 – July 14, 1893
- President: Benjamin Harrison; Grover Cleveland
- Preceded by: John Franklin Swift
- Succeeded by: Edwin Dun

28th Speaker of the California State Assembly
- In office January 1897 – March 1897
- Preceded by: John C. Lynch
- Succeeded by: Howard E. Wright
- In office January 1891 – March 1891
- Preceded by: Robert Howe
- Succeeded by: Frank H. Gould

Member of the California State Assembly
- In office January 3, 1921 – January 5, 1931
- Preceded by: Bismarck Bruck
- Succeeded by: Roy J. Nielsen
- Constituency: 11th district
- In office January 4, 1897 – January 2, 1899
- Preceded by: Owen Wade
- Succeeded by: Owen Wade
- Constituency: 18th district
- In office January 3, 1887 – January 2, 1893
- Preceded by: Henry A. Pellet
- Succeeded by: Eben B. Owen
- Constituency: 22nd district

District Attorney of Napa County
- In office 1880–1885

Personal details
- Born: Frank Leslie Coombs; December 27, 1853 Napa, California, U.S.
- Died: October 5, 1934 (aged 80) Napa, California, U.S.
- Resting place: Tulocay Cemetery
- Party: Republican
- Parent: Nathan Coombs (father)
- Relatives: John M. Coghlan (brother-in-law)

Frank Leslie Coombs (December 27, 1853 – October 5, 1934) was an American lawyer and politician who served one term as a congressman from California from 1901 to 1903.

== Early life and education ==
Frank Leslie Coombs was born in Napa, California, the son of Nathan Coombs and Maria Isabel Gordon. His maternal grandparents were William Gordon (who was a naturalized Mexican citizen originally from Ohio) and Juana Maria Lucero (who was Mexican). Coombs attended the public schools in California and Dorchester High School in Boston, Massachusetts. He graduated from the law department of Columbian University (now George Washington University Law School), Washington, D.C., in 1875.

== Career ==
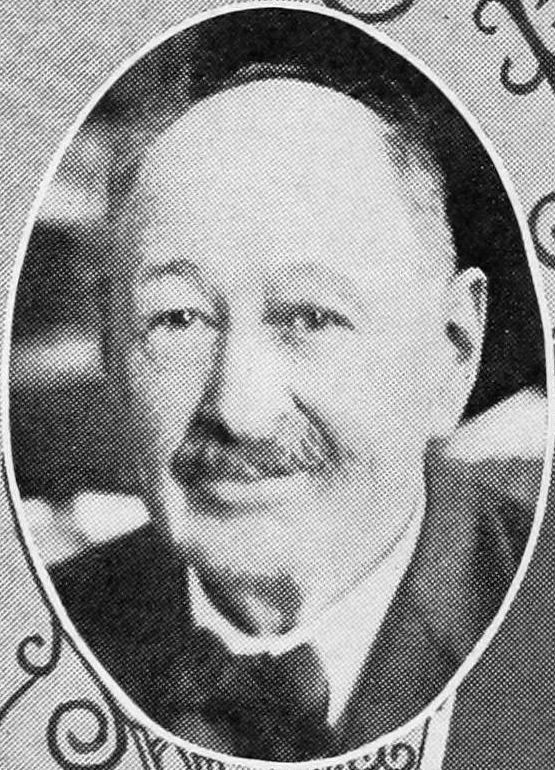
Coombs's official State Assembly portrait, 1924

Coombs was admitted to the bar in 1875 and commenced practice in Napa. He was the District Attorney of Napa County from 1880 to 1885.

Coombs was a member of the California State Assembly, serving from 1887 to 1893 and 1897 to 1899, each time representing Napa County, and served as Speaker in 1891 and again in 1897. On the death of John F. Swift, he was appointed United States Minister to Japan and served from June 1892 to August 1893. He was the State Librarian of California from April 1, 1898, to April 1, 1899. Coombs was the United States Attorney for the Northern District of California from April 1, 1899, to March 1, 1901.

=== Congress ===
Coombs was elected as a Republican to the Fifty-seventh Congress (March 4, 1901 to March 3, 1903) from the 1st congressional district of California. He was an unsuccessful candidate for reelection in 1902 in his redrawn district, which had been renumbered as the 2nd congressional district, losing by 49.2% to 48.3% to Democrat Theodore A. Bell.

== Later career and death ==
Coombs resumed the practice of law in Napa, and was again a member of the State Assembly from 1921 to 1931, representing Napa and Lake counties.

He died in Napa at age 80, and was buried in Tulocay Cemetery.

== Electoral history ==
=== 1900 ===
1900 United States House of Representatives elections
| Party | Candidate | Votes | % |
|---|---|---|---|
| Republican | Frank Coombs | 21,227 | 55.3 |
| Democratic | James F. Farraher | 16,270 | 42.4 |
| Social Democratic | William Morgan | 599 | 1.6 |
| Prohibition | Charles T. Clark | 310 | 0.8 |
| Total votes | | 38,406 | 100.0 |
| Turnout | | | |
| Republican hold | | | |

== See also ==
- List of Hispanic and Latino Americans in the United States Congress
- Elwood Bruner, for Coombs presiding at a heated Assembly meeting

Political offices
| Preceded by Henry A. Pellet | California State Assemblyman, 22nd District; 1887–1893 | Succeeded by Eben B. Owen |
| Preceded by Robert Howe | Speaker of the California State Assembly; January 1891 – March 1891 | Succeeded by Frank H. Gould |
| Preceded by Owen Wade | California State Assemblyman, 18th District; 1897–1899 | Succeeded by Owen Wade |
| Preceded by Bismarck Bruck | California State Assemblyman, 11th District; 1921–1931 | Succeeded by Roy J. Nielsen |
U.S. House of Representatives
| Preceded by John All Barham | United States Representative for the 1st district of California; 1901–1903 | Succeeded by James Gillett |
