= Thomas M. Carlson =

American politician

Thomas Carlson

Member of the California State Assembly from the 18th district
- In office January 8, 1923 - January 5, 1925
- Preceded by: James N. Long
- Succeeded by: Robert P. Easley

Personal details
- Party: Republican

Military service
- Branch/service: United States Army
- Battles/wars: World War I

Thomas M. Carlson served in the California State Assembly for the 18th district from January 8, 1923 - January 5, 1925. During World War I he served in the United States Army.

Carlson also served as an attorney.
