= 2026 California Attorney General election =

2026 California State Attorney General election
- November 3, 2026
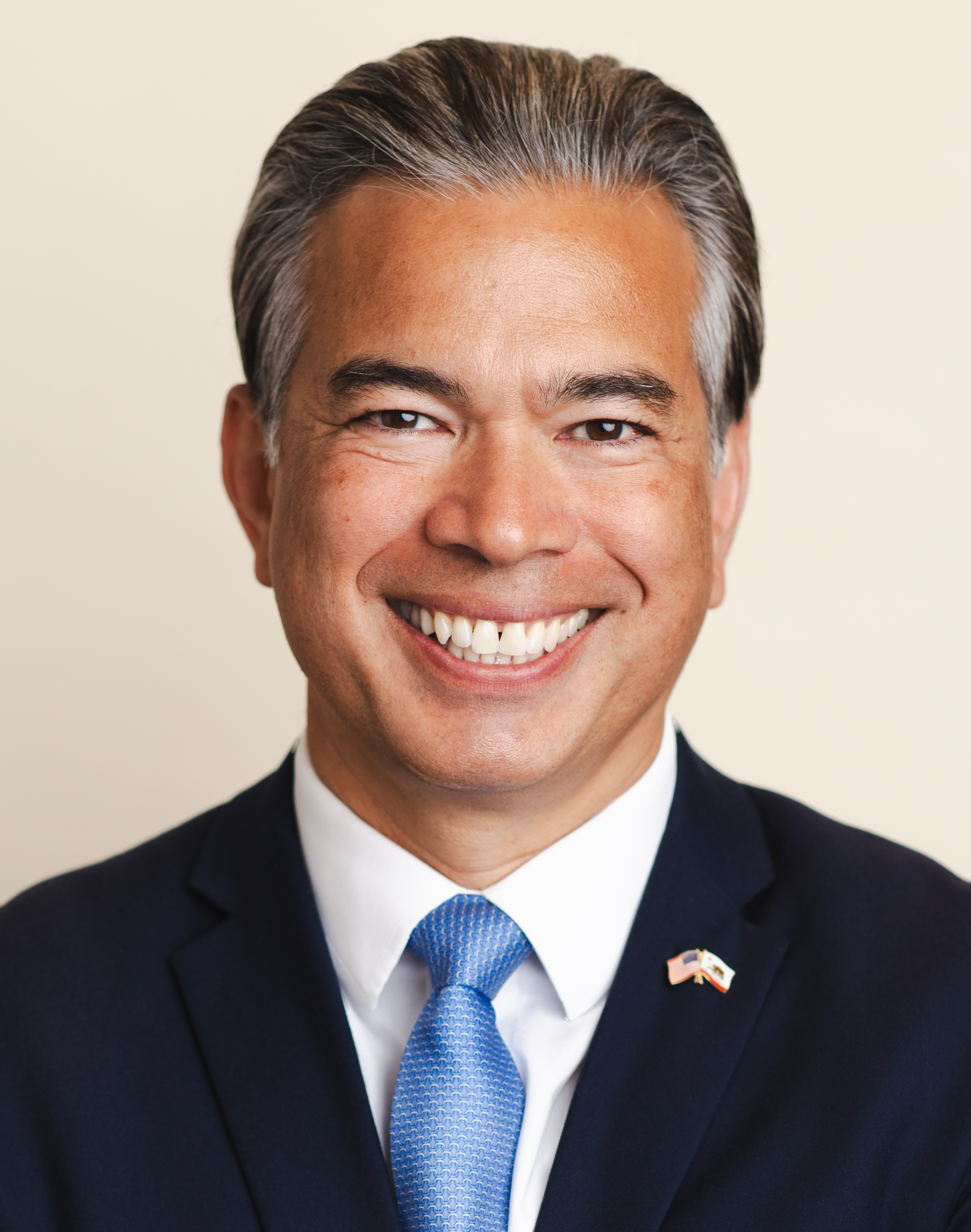

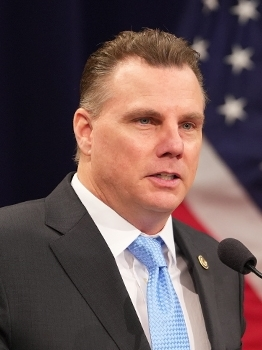
Candidate	Rob Bonta	Michael Gates
Party	Democratic	Republican
Popular vote	8,553,266	4,505,310
Percentage	65.5%	34.5%
- Bonta: 50–60% 60–70% 70–80% 80–90% Gates: 50–60% 60–70% 70–80%
Attorney General before election
Rob Bonta
Democratic
Elected Attorney General
Rob Bonta
Democratic

The 2026 California Attorney General election was held on November 3, 2026, to elect the attorney general of California. Incumbent Democratic attorney general Rob Bonta is running for re-election to a second full term in office. Candidates were required to declare by March 6 with primaries being held on June 2 with Bonta and former Huntington Beach city attorney Michael Gates advancing to the general election.

== Candidates ==
=== Democratic Party ===
==== Advanced to general ====
- Rob Bonta, incumbent attorney general (2021–present)

==== Declined ====
- Ben Allen, state senator from the 34th district (2018–present) (running for Insurance Commissioner)
- Lorena Gonzalez, president of the California Labor Federation (2022–present) and former state assemblymember from the 80th district (2013–2022)
- Rick Zbur, state assemblymember from the 51st district (2022–present)

=== Republican Party ===
==== Advanced to general ====
- Michael Gates, former Huntington Beach city attorney

=== Green Party ===
==== Eliminated in primary ====
- Marjorie Mikels, activist

== Primary election ==
=== Endorsements ===
Rob Bonta (D)

Labor unions

- California Faculty Association
- California Federation of Labor Unions
- California Nurses Association
- Los Angeles County Federation of Labor
- SEIU California
- SEIU United Healthcare Workers West
- International Brotherhood of Teamsters California

Organizations

- Asian American Action Fund
- Brady Campaign
- California Environmental Voters
- Everytown for Gun Safety
- Equality California
- Giffords
- Planned Parenthood Affiliates of California
- Sierra Club California and Angeles Chapter
- Stonewall Democratic Club

Political parties

- California Democratic Party

Newspapers

- Bay Area Reporter
- McClatchy Media California (Note: The Sacramento Bee, The Modesto Bee, The Fresno Bee, Merced Sun-Star, and The Tribune)
- San Francisco Chronicle
- San Francisco Examiner
- Sun-Reporter
Michael Gates (R)

State legislators

- Gloria Romero, former Democratic state senate majority leader (2005–2008) from the 24th district (2001–2010) and candidate for lieutenant governor of California in 2026

Individuals

- Steve Hilton, political commentator and candidate for governor of California in 2026

Political parties

- California Republican Party
Marjorie Mikels (G)

Political parties

- Green Party of California
- Peace and Freedom Party

=== Results ===
Results by county Bonta: 40–50%; 50–60%; 60–70%; 70–80%; Gates: 40–50%; 50–60%; 60–70%; 70–80%

Blanket primary results
Party	Candidate	Votes	%
Democratic	Rob Bonta (incumbent)	4,979,967	56.62
Republican	Michael Gates	3,337,433	37.94
Green	Marjorie Mikels	478,450	5.44
Total votes		8,795,850	100.00

==== By county ====
County	Rob Bonta Democratic		Michael Gates Republican		Marjorie Mikels Green		Margin		Total
County	#	%	#	%	#	%	#	%	Total
Alameda	282,776	74.19%	74,621	19.58%	23,755	6.23%	208,155	54.61%	381,152
Alpine	286	60.21%	164	34.53%	25	5.26%	122	25.68%	475
Amador	4,922	31.75%	9,964	64.28%	614	3.96%	-5,042	-32.53%	15,500
Butte	23,657	40.49%	31,295	53.57%	3,470	5.94%	-7,638	-13.07%	58,422
Calaveras	5,391	31.64%	10,998	64.55%	650	3.81%	-5,607	-32.91%	17,039
Colusa	1,219	29.64%	2,720	66.13%	174	4.23%	-1,501	-36.49%	4,113
Contra Costa	196,519	64.55%	91,801	30.15%	16,123	5.30%	104,718	34.40%	304,443
Del Norte	2,330	37.28%	3,608	57.73%	312	4.99%	-1,278	-20.45%	6,250
El Dorado	27,618	37.97%	42,234	58.06%	2,890	3.97%	-14,616	-20.09%	72,742
Fresno	76,155	43.83%	88,008	50.66%	9,572	5.51%	-11,853	-6.82%	173,735
Glenn	1,522	24.72%	4,426	71.89%	209	3.39%	-2,904	-47.17%	6,157
Humboldt	21,972	57.33%	12,834	33.49%	3,521	9.19%	9,138	23.84%	38,327
Imperial	12,531	52.38%	9,879	41.30%	1,512	6.32%	2,652	11.09%	23,922
Inyo	2,408	42.60%	2,899	51.29%	345	6.10%	-491	-8.69%	5,652
Kern	52,668	37.06%	82,835	58.29%	6,609	4.65%	-30,167	-21.23%	142,112
Kings	7,268	34.20%	13,009	61.21%	976	4.59%	-5,741	-27.01%	21,253
Lake	7,210	45.05%	7,792	48.69%	1,001	6.26%	-582	-3.64%	16,003
Lassen	1,294	18.03%	5,620	78.32%	262	3.65%	-4,326	-60.28%	7,176
Los Angeles	1,305,327	64.35%	603,360	29.74%	119,798	5.91%	701,967	34.61%	2,028,485
Madera	10,769	35.39%	18,332	60.24%	1,330	4.37%	-7,563	-24.85%	30,431
Marin	72,679	76.23%	18,491	19.39%	4,173	4.38%	54,188	56.83%	95,343
Mariposa	2,270	35.05%	3,922	60.55%	285	4.40%	-1,652	-25.51%	6,477
Mendocino	14,134	57.97%	8,362	34.29%	1,887	7.74%	5,772	23.67%	24,383
Merced	19,762	45.06%	21,573	49.19%	2,523	5.75%	-1,811	-4.13%	43,858
Modoc	547	20.85%	1,985	75.65%	92	3.51%	-1,438	-54.80%	2,624
Mono	1,862	52.87%	1,450	41.17%	210	5.96%	412	11.70%	3,522
Monterey	48,111	60.99%	26,193	33.20%	4,585	5.81%	21,918	27.78%	78,889
Napa	24,059	61.96%	12,726	32.77%	2,045	5.27%	11,333	29.19%	38,830
Nevada	20,561	50.03%	18,231	44.36%	2,304	5.61%	2,330	5.67%	41,096
Orange	356,825	46.67%	372,374	48.70%	35,417	4.63%	-15,549	-2.03%	764,616
Placer	60,473	41.27%	81,147	55.37%	4,925	3.36%	-20,674	-14.11%	146,545
Plumas	2,540	35.41%	4,276	59.60%	358	4.99%	-1,736	-24.20%	7,174
Riverside	244,520	47.40%	247,026	47.88%	24,335	4.72%	-2,506	-0.49%	515,881
Sacramento	212,713	56.73%	139,806	37.29%	22,417	5.98%	72,907	19.45%	374,936
San Benito	8,363	52.76%	6,678	42.13%	809	5.10%	1,685	10.63%	15,850
San Bernardino	175,395	46.28%	181,749	47.96%	21,834	5.76%	-6,354	-1.68%	378,978
San Diego	431,448	53.07%	338,456	41.63%	43,151	5.31%	92,992	11.44%	813,055
San Francisco	189,269	78.34%	35,004	14.49%	17,337	7.18%	154,265	63.85%	241,610
San Joaquin	60,900	46.52%	62,864	48.02%	7,158	5.47%	-1,964	-1.50%	130,922
San Luis Obispo	47,423	49.72%	43,647	45.76%	4,315	4.52%	3,776	3.96%	95,385
San Mateo	132,085	70.55%	45,915	24.52%	9,226	4.93%	86,170	46.02%	187,226
Santa Barbara	59,772	56.84%	39,394	37.46%	5,994	5.70%	20,378	19.38%	105,160
Santa Clara	257,367	65.08%	116,655	29.50%	21,438	5.42%	140,712	35.58%	395,460
Santa Cruz	57,629	70.96%	17,324	21.33%	6,257	7.70%	40,305	49.63%	81,210
Shasta	14,679	28.24%	35,252	67.81%	2,054	3.95%	-20,573	-39.57%	51,985
Sierra	390	32.39%	764	63.46%	50	4.15%	-374	-31.06%	1,204
Siskiyou	4,697	34.74%	8,121	60.07%	702	5.19%	-3,424	-25.33%	13,520
Solano	59,820	57.61%	38,892	37.46%	5,118	4.93%	20,928	20.16%	103,830
Sonoma	112,162	68.62%	41,626	25.47%	9,666	5.91%	70,536	43.15%	163,454
Stanislaus	40,265	42.01%	51,071	53.29%	4,504	4.70%	-10,806	-11.28%	95,840
Sutter	7,012	31.68%	14,169	64.02%	952	4.30%	-7,157	-32.34%	22,133
Tehama	3,759	23.60%	11,577	72.69%	591	3.71%	-7,818	-49.09%	15,927
Trinity	1,396	38.71%	1,975	54.77%	235	6.52%	-579	-16.06%	3,606
Tulare	24,875	36.18%	41,122	59.82%	2,750	4.00%	-16,247	-23.63%	68,747
Tuolumne	6,877	35.47%	11,683	60.26%	827	4.27%	-4,806	-24.79%	19,387
Ventura	117,490	53.43%	92,577	42.10%	9,839	4.47%	24,913	11.33%	219,906
Yolo	36,698	63.40%	16,955	29.29%	4,226	7.30%	19,743	34.11%	57,879
Yuba	5,298	33.09%	10,002	62.46%	713	4.45%	-4,704	-29.38%	16,013
Totals	4,979,967	56.62%	3,337,433	37.94%	478,450	5.44%	1,642,534	18.67%	8,795,850

== General election ==
=== Post-primary endorsements ===
Rob Bonta (D)

Newspapers

- Santa Barbara Independent

=== Predictions ===
Source	Ranking	As of
Sabato's Crystal Ball	Safe D	August 21, 2025

=== Results ===
2026 California Attorney General election
Party	Candidate	Votes	%	±%
Democratic	Rob Bonta (incumbent)			
Republican	Michael Gates			
Total votes				
Democratic hold				

Counties that flipped from Republican to Democratic

- Fresno (largest municipality: Fresno)
- Inyo (largest municipality: Bishop)
- Kern (largest municipality: Bakersfield)
- Merced (largest municipality: Merced)
- Orange (largest municipality: Anaheim)
- Riverside (largest municipality: Riverside)
- San Bernardino (largest municipality: San Bernardino)
- Stanislaus (largest municipality: Modesto)

== See also ==
- 2026 California elections
- 2026 United States attorney general elections
