= California's 18th State Assembly district =

American legislative district

Current assemblymember
Mia Bonta; D–Alameda
- Population (2010) • Voting age • Citizen voting age: 469,665; 365,624; 281,791
- Demographics: 23.96% White; 23.32% Black; 26.30% Latino; 23.50% Asian; 0.56% Native American; 0.70% Hawaiian/Pacific Islander; 0.33% other; 1.33% remainder of multiracial
- Registered voters: 270,094
- Registration: 64.05% Democratic; 6.82% Republican; 24.79% No party preference

California's 18th State Assembly district is one of 80 California State Assembly districts. It is currently represented by Democrat Mia Bonta of Alameda after winning the special election. She is married to her predecessor and the state's 34th Attorney General, Rob Bonta.

== District profile ==
The district encompasses the central East Bay, centered on the city of Oakland.

Alameda County – (28.83%)

- Alameda
- Oakland – (89.15%)
- Emeryville

== Election results from statewide races ==
Year	Office	Results
2021	Governor	Newsom 90 – 10%
2021	Senator	Padilla 90.5 – 9.5%
2021	Recall	No 88.9 – 11.1%
2020	President	Biden 86.5 – 11.3%
2018	Governor	Newsom 88.3 – 11.7%
2018	Senator	Feinstein 58.9 – 41.1%
2016	President	Clinton 85.9 – 8.4%
2016	Senator	Harris 78.7 – 21.3%
2014	Governor	Brown 89.6 – 10.4%
2012	President	Obama 86.9 – 10.2%
2012	Senator	Feinstein 89.5 – 10.5%

== List of assembly members representing the district ==
Due to redistricting, the 18th district has been moved around different parts of the state. The current iteration resulted from the 2021 redistricting by the California Citizens Redistricting Commission.

Assembly members	Party	Years served	Counties represented	Notes
Hugh McElroy LaRue	Democratic	January 3, 1883 – January 5, 1885	Sacramento	
Winfield J. Davis	Republican	January 5, 1885 – January 3, 1887	Sacramento	
Harry W. Carroll	Republican	January 3, 1887 – January 7, 1889	Sacramento	
William M. Petrie	Republican	January 7, 1889 – January 5, 1891	Sacramento	
Judson C. Brusie	Republican	January 5, 1891 – January 2, 1893	Sacramento	
Owen Wade	Republican	January 2, 1893 – January 4, 1897	Napa	
Frank Coombs	Republican	January 4, 1897 – January 2, 1899	Napa	
Owen Wade	Republican	January 2, 1899 – January 1, 1901	Napa	
Edward L. Webber	Republican	January 1, 1901 – January 5, 1903	Napa	
John M. Higgins	Republican	January 5, 1903 – January 2, 1905	Sacramento	
Frank J. O'Brien	Republican	January 2, 1905 – January 4, 1909	Sacramento	
Eldridge Lafayette Hawk	Republican	January 4, 1909 – January 2, 1911	Sacramento	
John C. March	Republican	January 2, 1911 – January 6, 1913	Sacramento	
Thomas D. Johnston	Republican	January 6, 1913 – January 4, 1915	Contra Costa	
William R. Sharkey	Progressive	January 4, 1915 – January 8, 1917	Contra Costa	
William E. Calahan	Republican	January 8, 1917 – December 25, 1919	Contra Costa	Died in office.
Vacant		December 25, 1919 – January 3, 1921	Contra Costa	
James N. Long	Republican	January 3, 1921 – January 8, 1923	Contra Costa	
Thomas M. Carlson	Republican	January 8, 1923 – January 5, 1925	Contra Costa	
Robert P. Easley	Republican	January 5, 1925 – January 5, 1931	Contra Costa	
Edwin H. Zion	Republican	January 5, 1931 – January 2, 1933	Stanislaus	
Charles W. Fisher	Republican	January 2, 1933 – January 4, 1937	Alameda	
Henry A. Dannenbrink	Democratic	January 4, 1937 – January 2, 1939	Alameda	
James H. Phillips	Republican	January 2, 1939 – January 4, 1943	Alameda	
Gardiner Johnson	Republican	January 4, 1943 – January 6, 1947	Alameda	
Thomas W. Caldecott	Republican	January 6, 1947 – September 26, 1957	Alameda	Resigned from the State Assembly to become a judge.
Vacant		September 26, 1957 – January 3, 1958	Alameda	
Don Mulford	Republican	January 3, 1958 – January 7, 1963	Alameda	Sworn in after winning a special election.
Edward M. Gaffney	Democratic	January 7, 1963 – January 4, 1965	San Francisco	
Willie Brown	Democratic	January 4, 1965 – November 30, 1974	San Francisco	
Leo T. McCarthy	Democratic	December 2, 1974 – November 30, 1982	San Francisco	
Alister McAlister	Democratic	December 6, 1982 – November 30, 1986	Alameda, Santa Clara	
Delaine Eastin	Democratic	December 1, 1986 – November 30, 1992	Alameda, Santa Clara	
Johan Klehs	Democratic	December 7, 1992 – November 30, 1994	Alameda	
Michael Sweeny	Democratic	December 5, 1994 – November 30, 1998	Alameda	
Ellen Corbett	Democratic	December 7, 1998 – November 30, 2004	Alameda	
Johan Klehs	Democratic	December 6, 2004 – November 30, 2006	Alameda	
Mary Hayashi	Democratic	December 4, 2006 – November 30, 2012	Alameda	
Rob Bonta	Democratic	December 3, 2012 – April 23, 2021	Alameda	Resigned from the State Assembly to become the Attorney General of California.
Vacant		April 23, 2021 – September 7, 2021	Alameda	
Mia Bonta	Democratic	September 7, 2021 – present	Alameda	Sworn in after winning special election.

== Election results (1990–present) ==
=== 2024 ===
2024 California State Assembly 18th district election
Primary election
Party	Candidate	Votes	%
Democratic	Mia Bonta (incumbent)	73,155	84.9
American Independent	Andre Sandford	4,582	5.3
Republican	Mindy Pechenuk	4,397	5.1
Republican	Cheyenne Kenney	4,012	4.7
Total votes		86,146	100.0
General election
Democratic	Mia Bonta (incumbent)	134,073	80.3
American Independent	Andre Sandford	32,983	19.7
Total votes		167,056	100.0
Democratic hold			

=== 2022 ===
2022 California State Assembly 18th district election
Primary election
Party	Candidate	Votes	%
Democratic	Mia Bonta	69,142	100.0
Republican	Mindy Pechenuk (write-in)	31	0.0
Total votes		69,173	100.0
General election
Democratic	Mia Bonta	120,863	89.9
Republican	Mindy Pechenuk	13,504	10.1
Total votes		134,367	100.0
Democratic hold			

=== 2021 (special) ===
2021 California State Assembly 18th district special election Vacancy resulting from the resignation of Rob Bonta
Primary election
Party	Candidate	Votes	%
Democratic	Mia Bonta	22,558	38.0
Democratic	Janani Ramachandran	14,036	23.7
Democratic	Malia Vella	10,053	16.9
Republican	Stephen Slauson	5,725	9.6
Democratic	Victor Aguilar	3,938	6.6
Democratic	James Aguilar	1,039	1.8
Democratic	Eugene Canson	1,029	1.7
No party preference	Joel Britton	750	1.3
Total votes		59,128	100.0
General election
Democratic	Mia Bonta	43,762	56.9
Democratic	Janani Ramachandran	33,181	43.1
Total votes		76,943	100.0
Democratic hold			

=== 2020 ===
2020 California State Assembly 18th district election
Primary election
Party	Candidate	Votes	%
Democratic	Rob Bonta (incumbent)	118,300	89.3
Republican	Stephen Slauson	14,158	10.7
Total votes		132,458	100.0
General election
Democratic	Rob Bonta (incumbent)	190,168	87.6
Republican	Stephen Slauson	26,942	12.4
Total votes		217,110	100.0
Democratic hold			

=== 2018 ===
2018 California State Assembly 18th district election
Primary election
Party	Candidate	Votes	%
Democratic	Rob Bonta (incumbent)	85,354	89.0
Republican	Stephen Slauson	10,549	11.0
Total votes		95,903	100.0
General election
Democratic	Rob Bonta (incumbent)	150,862	88.9
Republican	Stephen Slauson	18,894	11.1
Total votes		184,754	100.0
Democratic hold			

=== 2016 ===
2016 California State Assembly 18th district election
Primary election
Party	Candidate	Votes	%
Democratic	Rob Bonta (incumbent)	98,202	89.1
Republican	Roseann Slonsky-Breault	12,057	10.9
Total votes		110,259	100.0
General election
Democratic	Rob Bonta (incumbent)	156,163	87.0
Republican	Roseann Slonsky-Breault	23,273	13.0
Total votes		179,436	100.0
Democratic hold			

=== 2014 ===
2014 California State Assembly 18th district election
Primary election
Party	Candidate	Votes	%
Democratic	Rob Bonta (incumbent)	44,321	85.8
Republican	David Erlich	7,358	14.2
Total votes		51,679	100.0
General election
Democratic	Rob Bonta (incumbent)	88,243	86.7
Republican	David Erlich	13,537	13.3
Total votes		101,780	100.0
Democratic hold			

=== 2012 ===
2012 California State Assembly 18th district election
Primary election
Party	Candidate	Votes	%
Democratic	Rob Bonta	23,007	36.9
Democratic	Abel Guillen	18,521	29.7
Democratic	Joel Young	11,680	18.8
Republican	Rhonda Weber	9,082	14.6
Total votes		62,290	100.0
General election
Democratic	Rob Bonta	75,865	50.5
Democratic	Abel Guillen	74,422	49.5
Total votes		150,287	100.0
Democratic hold			

=== 2010 ===
2010 California State Assembly 18th district election
Party	Candidate	Votes	%
Democratic	Mary Hayashi (incumbent)	85,237	75.2
Republican	Michael Havig	28,124	24.8
Total votes		113,361	100.0
Democratic hold			

=== 2008 ===
2008 California State Assembly 18th district election
Party	Candidate	Votes	%
Democratic	Mary Hayashi (incumbent)	115,780	77.5
Republican	Lou Filipovich	33,596	22.5
Total votes		149,376	100.0
Democratic hold			

=== 2006 ===
2006 California State Assembly 18th district election
Party	Candidate	Votes	%
Democratic	Mary Hayashi	69,411	67.8
Republican	Jill Buck	32,897	32.2
Total votes		102,308	100.0
Democratic hold			

=== 2004 ===
2004 California State Assembly 18th district election
Party	Candidate	Votes	%
Democratic	Johan Klehs (incumbent)	106,635	83.6
Libertarian	Ronald J. Colfer	20,888	16.4
No party	Lou Filipovich (write-in)	17	0.0
Total votes		127,540	100.0
Democratic hold			

=== 2002 ===
2002 California State Assembly 18th district election
Party	Candidate	Votes	%
Democratic	Ellen M. Corbett (incumbent)	60,627	71.7
Republican	Jack Hovingh	24,028	28.3
Total votes		84,655	100.0
Democratic hold			

=== 2000 ===
2000 California State Assembly 18th district election
Party	Candidate	Votes	%
Democratic	Ellen Corbett (incumbent)	91,991	75.4
Republican	Syed Rifat Mahmood	29,936	24.6
Total votes		121,927	100.0
Democratic hold			

=== 1998 ===
1998 California State Assembly 18th district election
Party	Candidate	Votes	%
Democratic	Ellen M. Corbett	63,491	65.8
Republican	Carol Nowicki	33,060	34.2
Total votes		96,551	100.0
Democratic hold			

=== 1996 ===
1996 California State Assembly 18th district election
Party	Candidate	Votes	%
Democratic	Michael Sweeney (incumbent)	89,122	100.0
Total votes		89,122	100.0
Democratic hold			

=== 1994 ===
1994 California State Assembly 18th district election
Party	Candidate	Votes	%
Democratic	Michael Sweeney	69,863	69.7
Republican	Don J. Grundmann	30,310	30.3
Total votes		100,173	100.0
Democratic hold			

=== 1992 ===
1992 California State Assembly 18th district election
Party	Candidate	Votes	%
Democratic	Johan Klehs (incumbent)	87,971	65.0
Republican	Don J. Grundmann	38,027	28.1
Libertarian	Terry L. Floyd	9,297	6.9
Total votes		135,295	100.0
Democratic hold			

=== 1990 ===
1990 California State Assembly 18th district election
Party	Candidate	Votes	%
Democratic	Delaine Eastin (incumbent)	65,654	100.0
Total votes		65,654	100.0
Democratic hold			

== See also ==
- California State Assembly
- California State Assembly districts
- Districts in California
