= Matthew Rodriquez =

American attorney

Acting Attorney General of California
- In office March 18, 2021 – April 23, 2021
- Governor: Gavin Newsom
- Preceded by: Xavier Becerra
- Succeeded by: Rob Bonta

Secretary of the California Environmental Protection Agency
- In office 2011–2018
- Governor: Jerry Brown; Gavin Newsom
- Succeeded by: Jared Blumenfeld

Personal details
- Party: Democratic
- Education: University of California, Berkeley (BA); University of California, Hastings (JD)

Matthew Rodriquez is an American attorney who served as the acting Attorney General of California from March 18, 2021, when Attorney General Xavier Becerra became United States Secretary of Health and Human Services, until April 23, 2021, when Assemblyman Rob Bonta became Attorney General.

== Education ==
Rodriquez earned a Bachelor of Arts degree in history from the University of California, Berkeley and a Juris Doctor from the University of California, Hastings College of the Law.

== Career ==
In 1979, Rodriquez joined the staff of the California Coastal Commission as a graduate assistant. He later worked as an associate program analyst in the California Governor's Office of Planning and Research. He served as assistant city attorney of Livermore, California and deputy city attorney of Hayward, California. Rodriquez worked at the California Department of Justice for 24 years, specializing in environmental law. In 2008, he became assistant attorney general for the California Justice Department's Public Rights Division. In 2011, Rodriquez was nominated to serve as secretary of the California Environmental Protection Agency. He served in the position until 2018. Rodriquez assumed office as acting Attorney General of California on March 18, 2021, succeeding Xavier Becerra, until Rob Bonta took up office on April 23, 2021.

Legal offices
Preceded by Xavier Becerra	Attorney General of California; Acting; 2021	Succeeded by Rob Bonta
