= Janani Ramachandran =

American politician, Oakland City Council member

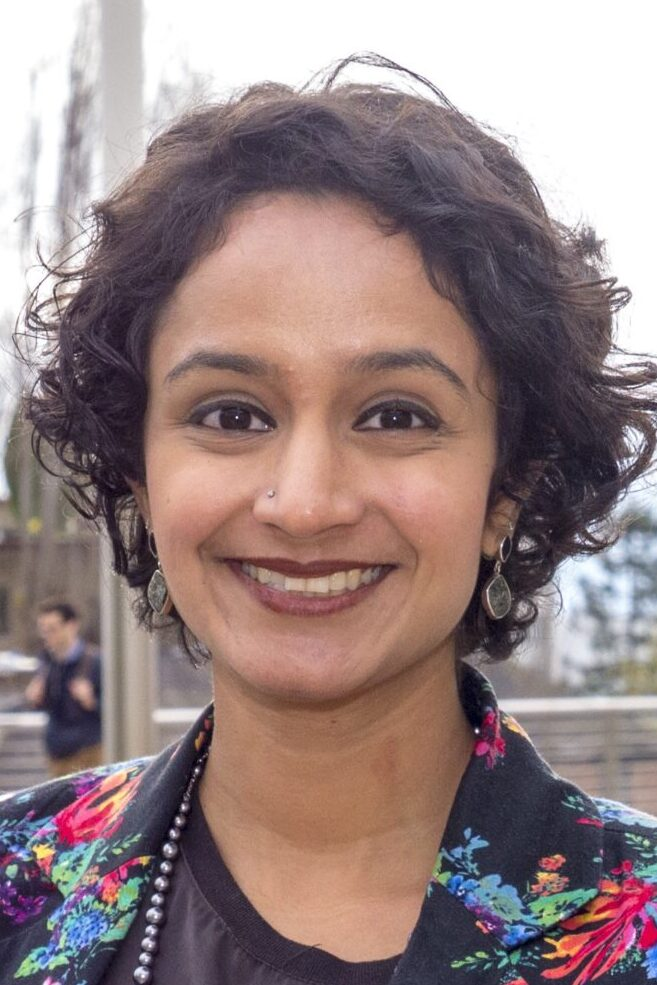

Member of the Oakland City Council from the 4th district
- Incumbent
- Assumed office January 2023
- Preceded by: Sheng Thao

Personal details
- Education: Stanford University; UC Berkeley School of Law (JD)

Janani Ramachandran is an American politician who is a member of the Oakland City Council, representing the city's 4th district.

== Early life and education ==
Ramachandran was born and raised in the East Bay. She is of South Indian descent. She attended Stanford University and worked as a case manager at a community health clinic serving immigrant mothers. She later graduated from Berkeley Law School. After graduating from law school, she worked in human rights law.

== Political career ==
In 2021, she ran for California State Assembly and was defeated by Mia Bonta.

Ramachandran defeated opponent Nenna Joiner in the 2022 District 4 city council race. She became the youngest person to be elected to the council and the first of South Asian descent. She is also the first LGBTQ woman of color elected. She has announced her intention to run again in the 2026 race.

== Personal life ==
Ramachandran identifies as queer. She has one son.
