= Owen Wade (politician) =

American politician (1831–1902)

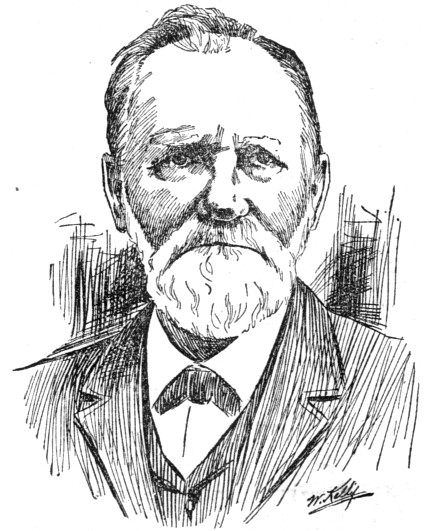
- An illustration of Wade from The San Francisco Call, circa 1896

Member of the California State Assembly from the 18th district
- In office January 2, 1899 – January 1, 1901
- Preceded by: Frank Coombs
- Succeeded by: Edward L. Webber

Member of the California State Assembly from the 18th district
- In office January 2, 1893 – January 4, 1897
- Preceded by: Judson C. Brusie
- Succeeded by: Frank Coombs

Member of the Oregon House of Representatives
- In office 1862–1865

Personal details
- Born: October 28, 1831 Morgan County, Ohio, U.S.
- Died: May 18, 1902 (aged 70) San Francisco, California, U.S.
- Party: Republican
- Spouse: Charlotte Johnson (m. 1866–1873)
- Children: 3

Owen Wade (1831 – 1902) was an American politician and who served as a member of the Oregon Legislature and California State Assembly.

== Early life and education ==
Wade was born on October 28, 1831, in Morgan County, Ohio, where he lived with his parents on a farm. In 1852, he relocated to the Willamette Valley in Oregon.

== Career ==
Wade was elected to the Oregon Legislature in 1862, serving until 1865. In 1865, he was appointed Registrar of General Land Office in Oregon City, Oregon, by President Abraham Lincoln. In 1872, he served as chairman of the Republican Central Committee for Clackamas County. He retained the position of registrar until his resignation in January 1878. In 1879, he went to California and settled in St. Helena, California. There, in 1883, he became a cashier at the Bank of St. Helena. In 1892, he was elected to the California State Assembly. He was re-elected in 1894 and again in 1898.

== Personal life ==
He married Charlotte Johnson in Clackamas County, Oregon, in 1866. They had three children. Charlotte died shortly after the birth of their last daughter in 1873. He died in San Francisco on May 18, 1902.
