= Kathleen Kenealy =

American attorney and politician

Kate Kenealy

Acting Attorney General of California
- In office January 3, 2017 – January 24, 2017
- Governor: Jerry Brown
- Preceded by: Kamala Harris
- Succeeded by: Xavier Becerra

Personal details
- Born: Kathleen Alice Kenealy
- Party: Democratic
- Education: George Mason University (BA); Catholic University of America (JD)

Kathleen Alice Kenealy is an American attorney and politician who served 21 days as Acting Attorney General of California in 2017. She took office after Kamala Harris resigned to take her seat in the United States Senate. Kenealy was succeeded by Xavier Becerra, after the California State Legislature confirmed his appointment as the state's new attorney general. She attended George Mason University for her bachelor's degree and the Columbus School of Law at Catholic University of America for her Juris Doctor.

Legal offices
Preceded by Kamala Harris	Attorney General of California; Acting; 2017	Succeeded by Xavier Becerra
