= Xavier Becerra =

Governor-elect of California (born 1958)

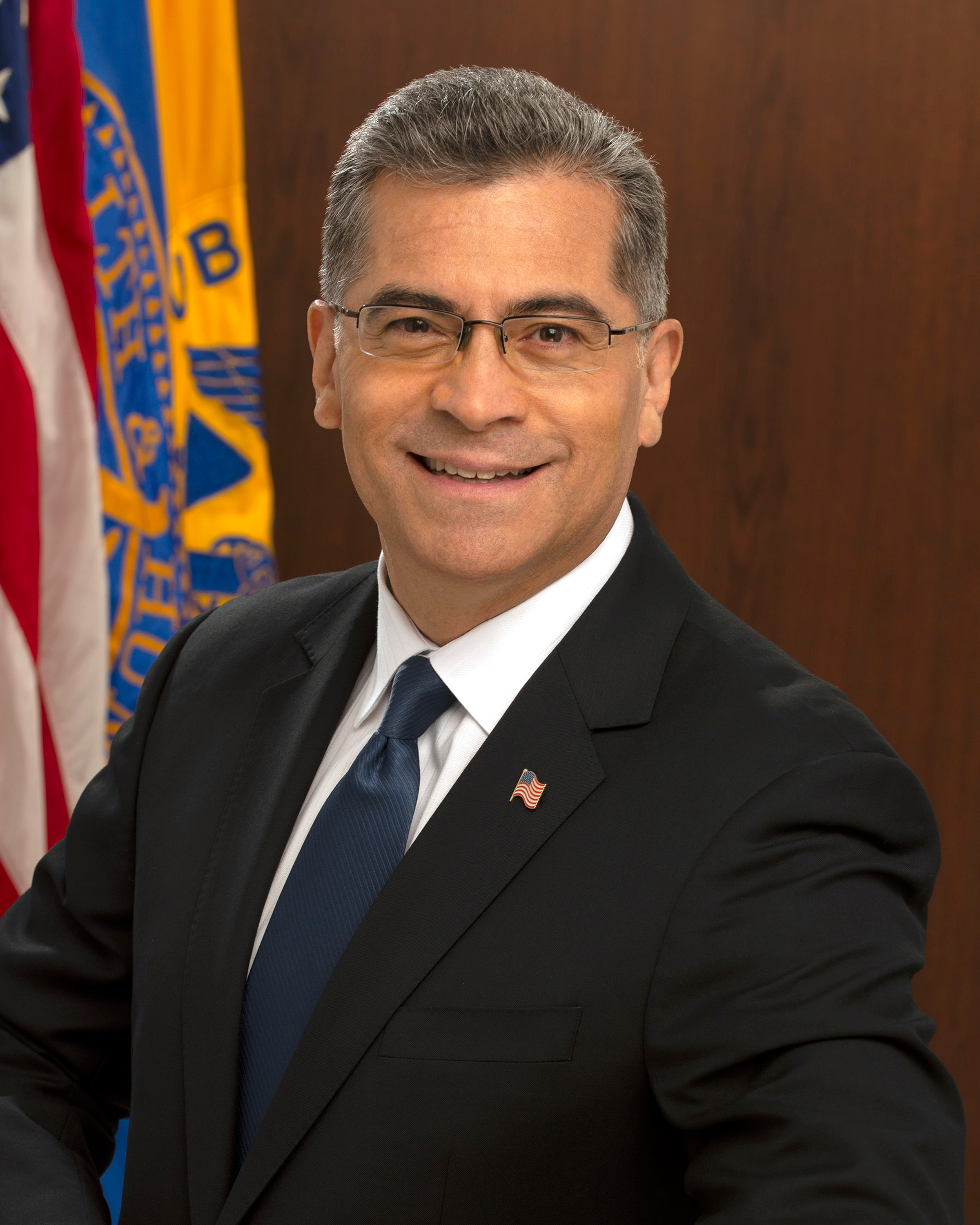
- Official portrait, 2021

Governor-elect of California
- Assuming office January 4, 2027
- Lieutenant: Fiona Ma (elect)
- Succeeding: Gavin Newsom

25th United States Secretary of Health and Human Services
- In office March 19, 2021 – January 20, 2025
- President: Joe Biden
- Deputy: Andrea Palm
- Preceded by: Alex Azar
- Succeeded by: Robert F. Kennedy Jr.

33rd Attorney General of California
- In office January 24, 2017 – March 18, 2021
- Governor: Jerry Brown; Gavin Newsom
- Preceded by: Kamala Harris
- Succeeded by: Rob Bonta

Member of the U.S. House of Representatives from California
- In office January 3, 1993 – January 24, 2017
- Preceded by: Edward Roybal (redistricted)
- Succeeded by: Jimmy Gomez
- Constituency: 30th district (1993–2003); 31st district (2003–2013); 34th district (2013–2017)
House positions
Chair of the House Democratic Caucus
In office January 3, 2013 – January 3, 2017
Deputy	Joe Crowley
Leader	Nancy Pelosi
Preceded by	John Larson
Succeeded by	Joe Crowley
Vice Chair of the House Democratic Caucus
In office January 3, 2009 – January 3, 2013
Leader	Nancy Pelosi
Preceded by	John Larson
Succeeded by	Joe Crowley
House Democratic Assistant to the Leader
In office January 3, 2007 – January 3, 2009
Leader	Nancy Pelosi
Preceded by	John Spratt
Succeeded by	Chris Van Hollen
Chair of the Congressional Hispanic Caucus
In office January 3, 1997 – January 3, 1999
Preceded by	Ed Pastor
Succeeded by	Lucille Roybal-Allard

Member of the California State Assembly from the 59th district
- In office December 3, 1990 – December 3, 1992
- Preceded by: Charles Calderon
- Succeeded by: Dick Mountjoy

Personal details
- Born: January 26, 1958 (age 68) Sacramento, California, U.S.
- Party: Democratic
- Spouse: Carolina Reyes (m. 1989)
- Children: 3
- Education: Stanford University (BA, JD)
- Website: Campaign website
- Becerra's voice Becerra's opening statement on HHS's 2024 budget. Recorded March 22, 2023

Xavier Becerra (Note: /ˌhɑːviˈɛər bəˈsɛrə/; Spanish: [xaˈβjeɾ beˈsera]) (born January 26, 1958) is an American attorney and politician who is the governor-elect of California. A member of the Democratic Party, Becerra served as the 25th United States secretary of health and human services under President Joe Biden from 2021 to 2025 and as the 33rd attorney general of California from 2017 to 2021. He also served in the California State Assembly and the U.S. House of Representatives.

Born and raised in Sacramento to Mexican immigrants, Becerra received his Bachelor of Arts and Juris Doctor from Stanford University. After college, he was an administrative assistant to state senator Art Torres and a deputy attorney general in the California Department of Justice. He later served one term in the California State Assembly from 1990 to 1992.

First elected to the U.S. House of Representatives in 1992, Becerra chaired the Congressional Hispanic Caucus from 1997 to 1999 and the House Democratic Caucus from 2013 to 2017. In 2017, Governor Jerry Brown appointed him attorney general after Kamala Harris was elected to the U.S. Senate. He was elected to a full term in 2018 and served until he joined the Biden cabinet in 2021.

Becerra was elected governor of California in 2026, defeating Republican nominee Steve Hilton. Upon taking office, he will become the first Latino governor of California since 1875, when Romualdo Pacheco ascended to the governorship, and the first elected by popular vote.

== Early life and education ==
Becerra was born on January 26, 1958, in Sacramento, California. He is the son of Maria Teresa and Manuel Guerrero Becerra. His father was born in Sacramento and raised in Tijuana, Baja California, Mexico, and later moved back to the U.S. as a teenager. His mother is from Guadalajara, Jalisco, Mexico. Becerra grew up in a one-room apartment with his three sisters. He graduated in 1976 from C. K. McClatchy High School. He studied abroad at the University of Salamanca in Spain from 1978 to 1979 and earned his Bachelor of Arts in economics from Stanford University in 1980, becoming the first person in his family to graduate from college. He received his Juris Doctor from Stanford Law School in 1984 and was admitted to the State Bar of California in 1985.

== Early career ==
As an attorney, Becerra worked on cases involving individuals who had mental disorders for the Legal Assistance Corporation of Central Massachusetts (now Community Legal Aid).

Becerra returned to California, and in 1986, became an administrative assistant for Democratic state senator Art Torres of Los Angeles. He served as a deputy attorney general in the California Department of Justice under Attorney General John Van de Kamp from 1987 to 1990.

After incumbent state assembly member Charles Calderon decided to seek a seat in the California Senate, Becerra launched a campaign for the California State Assembly, defeating Calderon's Senate aide Marta Maestas in the Democratic primary. He defeated Republican Lee Lieberg and Libertarian Steven Pencall, receiving 60% of the vote. Becerra served one term in the State Assembly, representing California's 59th district, from 1990 to 1992.

== U.S. House of Representatives (1993–2017) ==
=== Elections ===
In 1992, Becerra won the Democratic primary in California's 30th congressional district with a plurality of 32% of the vote. In the general election, he defeated Republican nominee Morry Waksberg, 58%–24%. He won re-election to a second term in 1994 with 66% of the vote. His district was renumbered as the 31st district after the 2000 census.

After redistricting, ahead of the 2012 elections, most of Becerra's old district became the 34th district. He defeated Republican Stephen Smith 85.6% to 14.4%.

=== Tenure ===
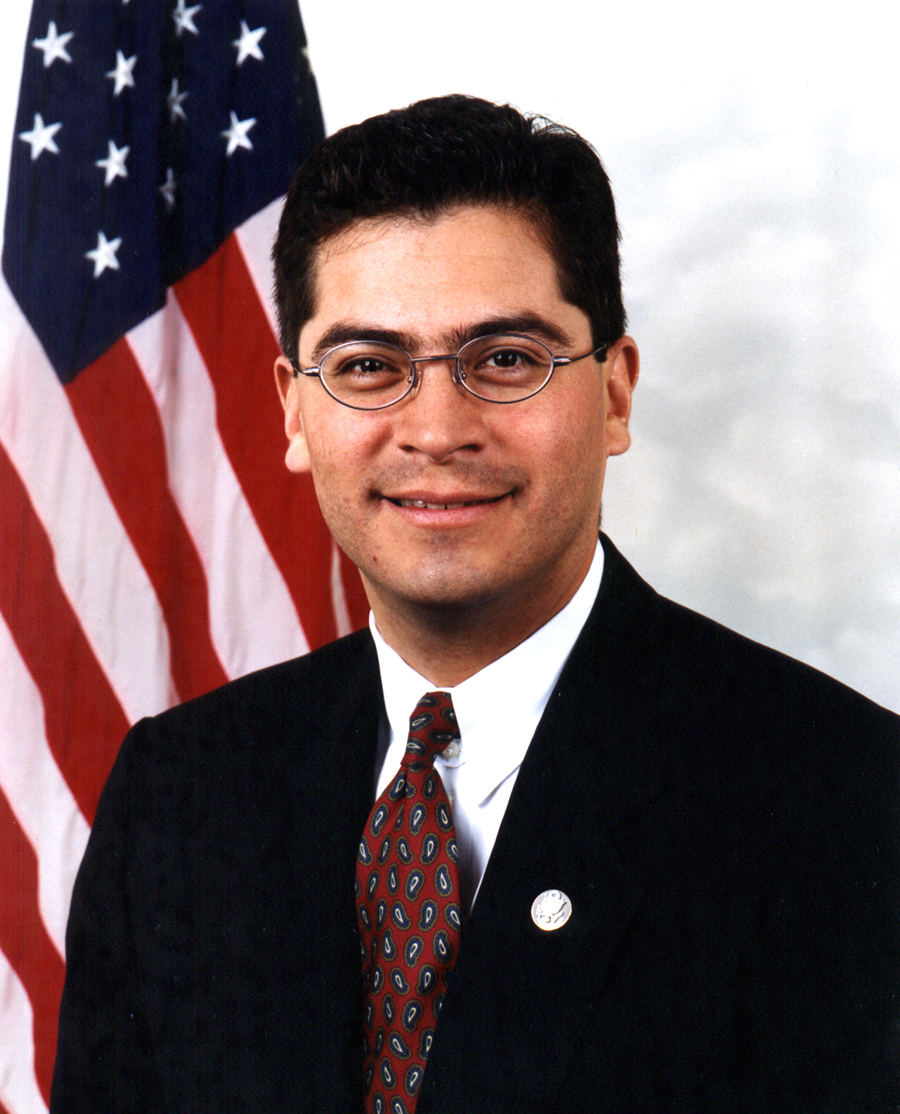
Official portrait, 2004

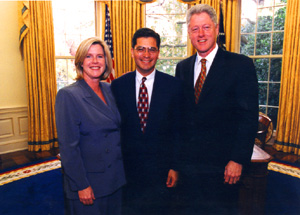
Tipper Gore (left), Becerra (center), and President Bill Clinton

Becerra was a member of the Congressional Hispanic Caucus, of which he served as chair during the 105th Congress.

Becerra was appointed assistant to the speaker of the House for the 110th Congress. He won his bid to succeed John Larson as vice chair in the 111th Congress, defeating Marcy Kaptur of Ohio by a vote of 175–67. Becerra successfully ran for a second term as vice chair in 2011 to serve during the 112th Congress. He served as chair of the House Democratic Caucus from 2013 to 2017.

==== Abortion rights ====
Becerra voted against H.R. 3541, the Prenatal Non-Discrimination Act (PRENDA), which would have imposed civil and criminal penalties on anyone knowingly attempting to perform a sex-selective abortion.

Becerra argued before the United States Court of Appeals for the Ninth Circuit that the Little Sisters of the Poor, a Catholic religious order, should be required to provide birth control services under the Affordable Care Act. In late 2020, arguing that the prosecution would discourage pregnant women from obtaining addiction treatment, Becerra urged the California Supreme Court to drop a murder charge against Chelsea Becker, a woman who had been arrested following a stillbirth in which methamphetamine was found in the fetus's system. He contended that the state's murder statute was intended to protect pregnant women from third-party violence, not to criminalize them for the outcomes of their own pregnancies.

==== 2001 Los Angeles mayoral election ====
Becerra ran for mayor of Los Angeles in 2001. He finished with 6% of the primary vote.

==== Consideration for federal government positions ====
In 2008, Becerra was considered for the position of U.S. trade representative in the administration of President-elect Obama. While it was reported that he had already accepted, he announced on December 15 that he would not accept the position.

Becerra was on the shortlist of presumptive Democratic presidential nominee Hillary Clinton for the vice presidential nomination in 2016. Senator Tim Kaine was eventually chosen.

=== Committee assignments ===
- Committee on Ways and Means
  - Subcommittee on Oversight
  - Subcommittee on Health
  - Subcommittee on Social Security
- Joint Select Committee on Deficit Reduction

=== Caucus memberships ===
- Congressional Hispanic Caucus (Former Chair)
- Congressional Asian Pacific American Caucus
- Congressional Progressive Caucus

== California attorney general (2017–2021) ==
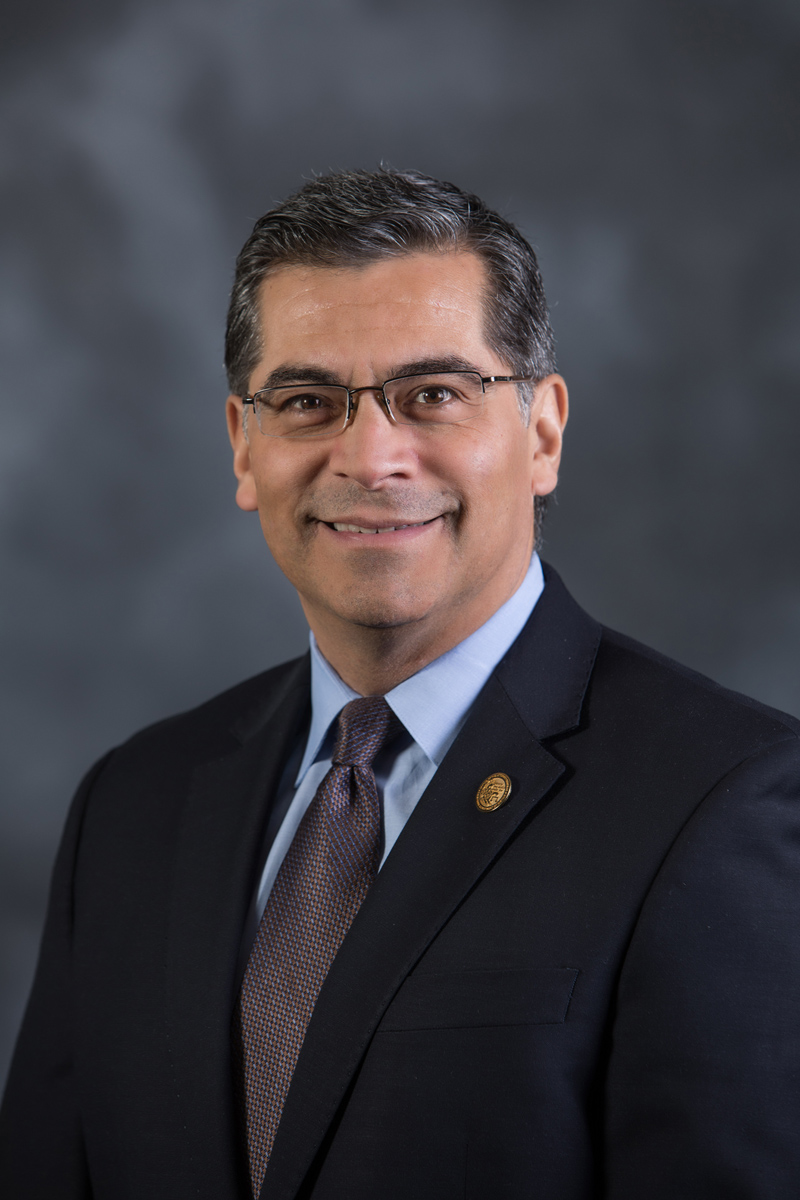
Official portrait, 2017

On January 24, 2017, upon appointment by California governor Jerry Brown, Becerra took office and became the first Latino to serve as California's attorney general. Becerra was elected to a full four-year term in 2018, defeating Republican Steven Bailey with 63% of the vote. He delivered the Democratic Spanish-language response to President Trump's 2019 State of the Union address.

During his term as attorney general, Becerra filed 122 lawsuits against the first Trump administration.

=== California Department of Justice reforms ===
==== Bureau of Environmental Justice ====
In 2018, Becerra created an environmental justice bureau at the California Department of Justice. It opposed the effort to expand San Bernardino International Airport due to concerns regarding air pollution, intervened to halt a proposed waterfront cement plant in Vallejo, citing significant concerns over increased air pollution and greenhouse gas emissions, and supported the City of Arvin's oil and gas ordinance, endorsing a 300-foot buffer for homes, schools, and hospitals.

==== Protection of endangered species in Sacramento and San Joaquin River ====
On May 11, 2020, Becerra secured a preliminary injunction in this lawsuit against the Trump Administration for unlawfully expanding water export operations in the Central Valley.

=== Criminal law enforcement ===
On June 4, 2019, Becerra announced the arrest of Naasón Joaquín García, leader of the Mexican megachurch La Luz Del Mundo and other co-defendants. Charges included human trafficking, production of child pornography, and forcible rape of a minor. On June 8, 2022, Naasón Joaquín García was sentenced to more than 16 years in a California prison. In the same year, Becerra filed charges against a number of men for their alleged involvement in a statewide organized crime ring engaged in sex trafficking, tax fraud, and money laundering. Five suspects were sentenced in March 2022.

Becerra brought fourteen felony charges against Center for Medical Progress activists for secretly recording fourteen videos, and one felony charge for conspiring to invade privacy, on March 28, 2017. Two members of the group pleaded no contest to a felony each in 2025. In August 2018, an operation targeted the MS-13 gang in the Central Valley and beyond. The following year, multiple operations were directed against Norteño street gangs in Kings, Tulare, and Stanislaus Counties, as well as in Stockton. In December 2019, the Country Boy Crips in south Bakersfield were the focus of a significant operation.

In December 2020, Becerra was faulted by state district attorneys for not taking leadership to help stop unemployment fraud during the COVID-19 pandemic, in what was described as the "biggest taxpayer fraud in California history". In January 2021, investigators said the total fraud was over $11 billion, with $19 billion in claims still under investigation. Most of this money will likely never be recovered, prosecutors said.

=== Transparency ===
In 2019, Becerra threatened legal action against reporters who had received records of California law enforcement officers who had been convicted of crimes during the past decade. The First Amendment Coalition stated about his position that it was "disheartening and ominous that the highest law enforcement officer in the state is threatening legal action over something the First Amendment makes clear can't give rise to criminal action". One of the reporters stated that Becerra's legal threat was "just completely wrong in its interpretation of the law" and "had real implications for press freedom". The reporters ultimately published a number of articles about the records, and Becerra never prosecuted them.

Becerra refused to offer independent investigation into the killing of Sean Monterrosa, who had been shot in the back of the head by police. He later opposed a bill that would have required him to do so. Becerra said in a public statement that there were "significant" allegations of "destruction of evidence" in the case of Monterrosa's killing.

Two major state newspapers have criticized Becerra for, they stated, shielding law enforcement and lacking transparency. A number of news outlets stated that a significant part of his campaign support was provided by law enforcement unions. In a move that was criticized by his own party, Becerra refused to enforce a state law that required the government to release information about police officers accused of rape and physical abuse, ultimately resisting lawsuits for at least six years and despite having been ruled against by an appeals court.

=== Death penalty ===
During the COVID-19 pandemic, Becerra acted to uphold a number of death penalty sentences. He stated in 2020 that he supported capital punishment with "serious reservations", while also stating that its applications were "deeply flawed" and that a number of "Americans have been wrongly sentenced to death in this country and later exonerated". He had earlier voted to repeal the death penalty in California in 2016. In 2017, he pursued the death penalty for a mass murderer. Becerra described Newsom’s 2019 decision to stop executions in the state as a "new direction in California's march toward perfecting our search for justice". The Los Angeles Times wrote in the same year that Becerra had "declined" to answer whether he supported capital punishment or not, stating only that the death penalty was part of the state law he had a duty to enforce. Two years later, his attorney general's office successfully argued to make it easier for juries to recommend death sentences, a position that Newsom argued against in court.

An article by Amherst College professor Austin Sarat stated that Becerra had not, as attorney general, addressed the issues of "racial discrimination, the impact of geography, and the risk of false convictions" in California's death penalty cases. Robert Lewis, a Black man with an IQ of 70, was sentenced to death in 1991, but was later ruled ineligible due to being intellectually disabled. In 2017, Becerra unsuccessfully sought to have a court artificially inflate Lewis' IQ score in order for him to be deemed eligible for the death penalty.

While arguing in favor Lewis' death penalty eligibility in court, Becerra's office stated that his IQ score had been underestimated because Lewis' background was similar to that of "African American children [who] scored much more poorly on these tests than did the group against which the test was normed". Law professor Lara Bazelon described the argument as "alarming" and "race-based". The court ruled in favor of Lewis in a 7–0 decision. Two years later, the state legislature banned the practice of adjusting IQ scoring based on race in death penalty cases.

=== Lawsuits against Trump administration ===
==== Defense of Deferred Action for Childhood Arrivals (DACA) ====
In November 2019, Becerra led a coalition of 21 attorneys general to defend DACA against the Trump Administration's attempt to terminate it. The Court found that the administration's actions to end DACA were unlawful.

==== Defense of the Affordable Care Act (ACA) ====
Becerra led the multi-state lawsuit to preserve the ACA's protections for people with pre-existing conditions and Medicaid expansion. The Supreme Court upheld the law.

==== Additional federal litigation ====
In February 2019, Becerra, Governor Gavin Newsom, and 15 other states filed a lawsuit against the Trump administration over the president's declaration of a national emergency to fund a wall at the southern U.S. border.

The Trump administration opened 1 million acres in California to fracking and drilling in December 2019. Under this policy, the Bureau of Land Management proposed new lease sales for oil and gas extraction along "California's Central Valley and Central Coast, touching eight counties and including 400,000 acres of public land". California officials and agencies, including Becerra, filed a lawsuit against the Bureau of Land Management in January 2020.

On December 9, 2020, Becerra's office joined 47 other states and the Federal Trade Commission in an antitrust lawsuit against Facebook.

=== 2020 U.S. Senate speculation ===
In August 2020, California senator Kamala Harris was selected by presumptive Democratic presidential nominee Joe Biden as his vice presidential running mate. After Biden ultimately won the general election, Becerra was floated as a possible replacement for Harris' senate seat, along with others such as Representative Karen Bass, Representative Barbara Lee, California Secretary of State Alex Padilla (who was eventually chosen), and former United States Secretary of Labor Hilda Solis.

== U.S. Secretary of Health and Human Services (2021–2025) ==
=== Nomination and confirmation ===
The New York Times reported in early December 2020 that Biden would nominate Becerra to be secretary of health and human services. His nomination to lead the Health and Human Services Department drew criticism from pro-life and conservative leaders led by Students for Life of America, citing his "absence of health care experience and his disregard for people of faith". Becerra's nomination was deadlocked by the Senate Finance Committee on March 10, 2021. One day later, on March 11, 2021, Becerra's nomination was discharged from the Finance Committee by the entire Senate, in a 51–48 vote. He was confirmed by the Senate in a 50–49 vote on March 18, 2021, with all but one Democrat present and one Republican, Susan Collins, voting in favor. This was the narrowest vote for any of Biden's cabinet positions. On March 22, 2021, Becerra was sworn in to be the new secretary.

=== Tenure ===
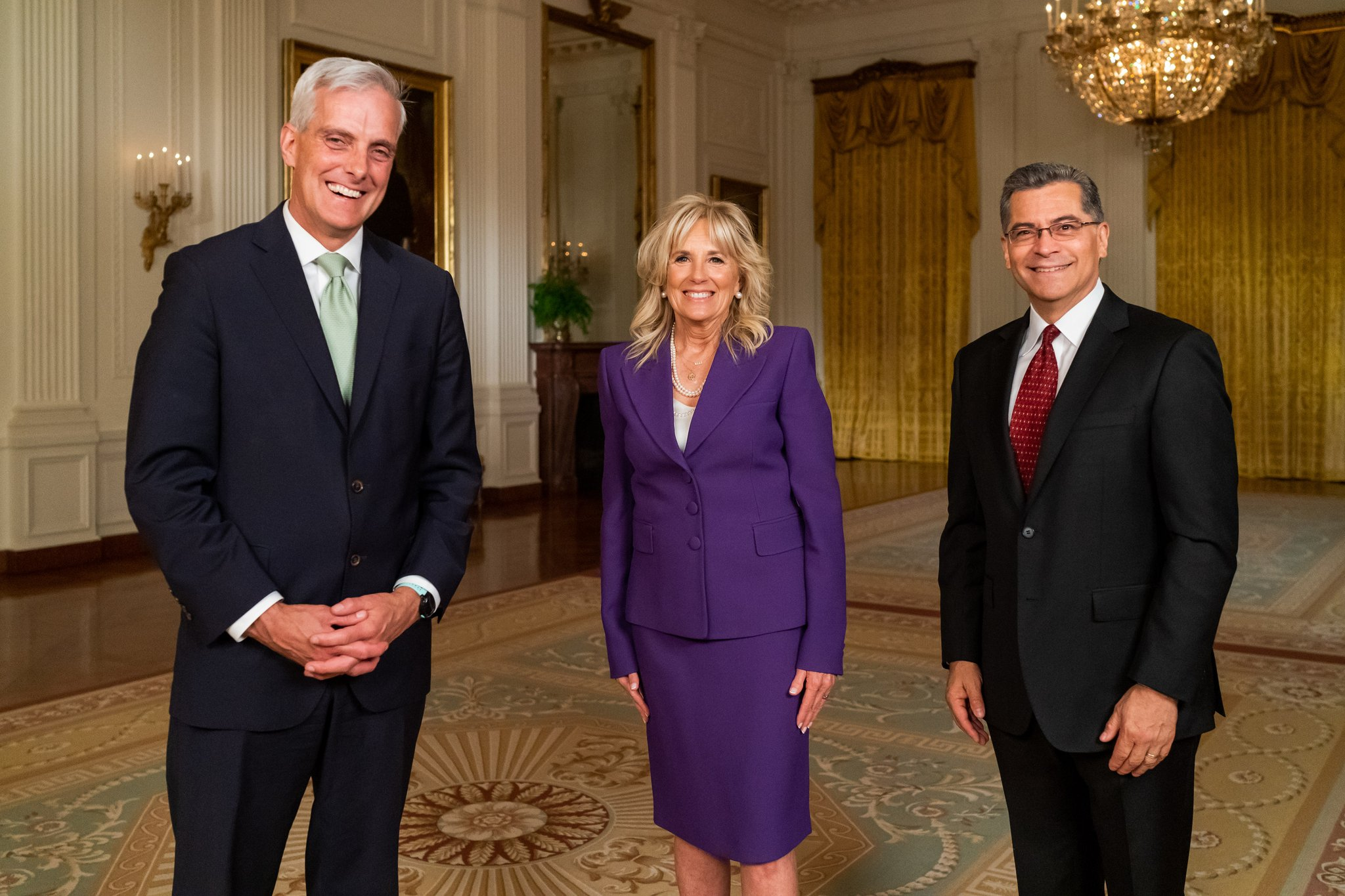
Secretary Becerra with First Lady Jill Biden (center) and Secretary of Veterans Affairs Denis McDonough (left), June 4, 2021

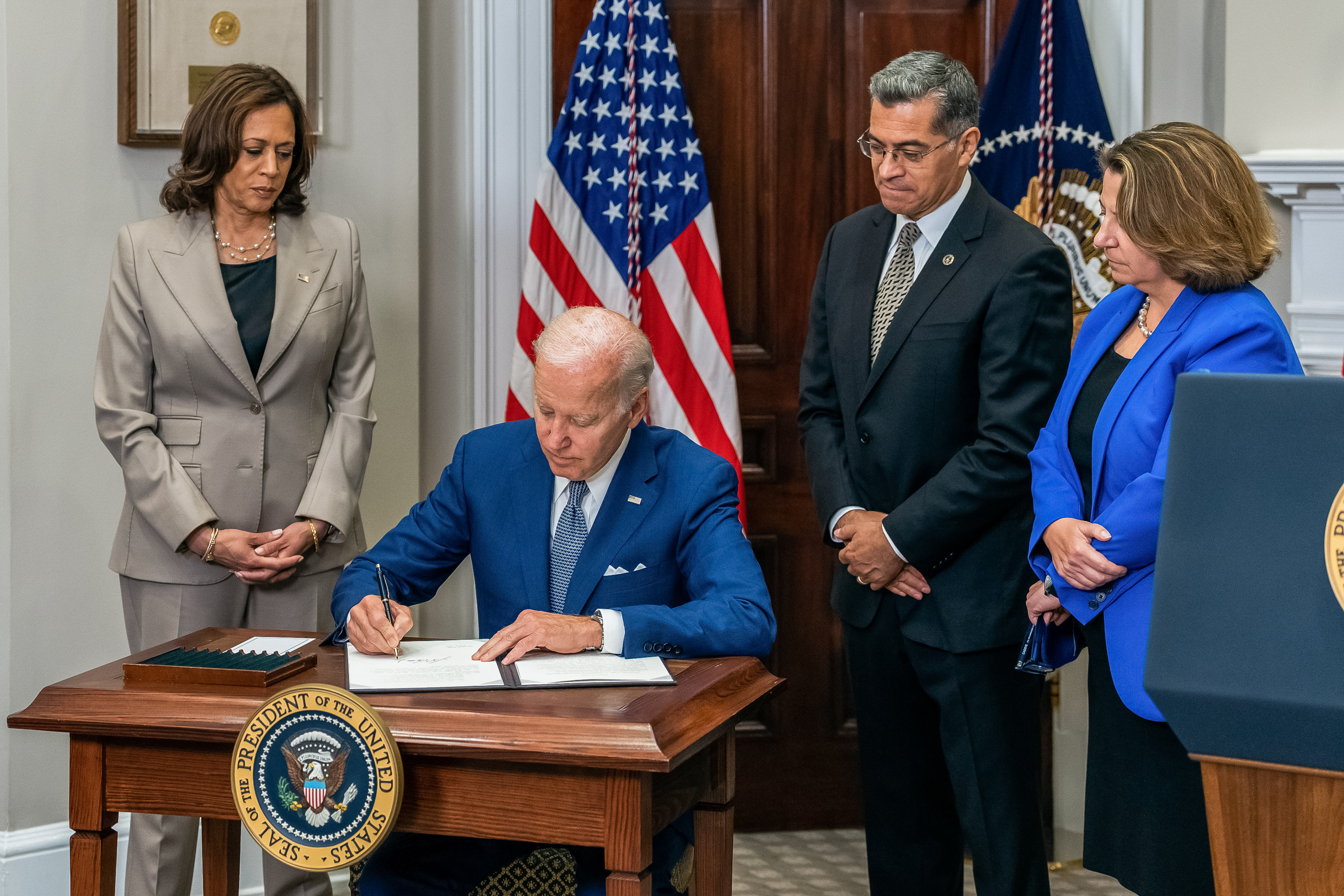
Becerra, Vice President Kamala Harris, and Lisa Monaco watch as President Joe Biden signs an executive order protecting access to reproductive healthcare service, July 8, 2022

Soon after officially becoming the secretary of health and human services, Becerra released a statement praising the Affordable Care Act and encouraging people to keep enrolling in its health care program.

After the Supreme Court's 2022 ruling in Dobbs v. Jackson Women's Health Organization, Becerra directed HHS to expand access to abortion-related care where it could. Under his leadership the department also expanded Medicaid and CHIP postpartum coverage for more than half the states in the nation.

==== Medicare drug price negotiations ====
For Medicare beneficiaries, Becerra allowed direct price negotiations for high-cost medications under the Inflation Reduction Act. In 2023, Becerra and HHS finalized negotiations for 10 high-cost drugs, including Eliquis, Jardiance, and Xarelto, achieving discounts of 38% to 79%. These lower prices, effective in 2026, would have saved Medicare $6 billion in 2023 alone. Later, Becerra announced 15 additional drugs for negotiation in 2025, with reduced prices set to take effect in 2027 for drugs that treat conditions such as cancer, diabetes, and asthma.

==== Unaccompanied migrant children ====
In his role, Becerra was responsible for the Administration for Children and Families and its Office of Refugee Resettlement (ORR) which is responsible for the care of unaccompanied minors after they cross the border. ORR typically places children in government shelters and screens adults who come forward to sponsor them, a system which came under stress during Becerra's tenure due to an increase in border crossings. Employees told The New York Times that Becerra urged staff to move children through the processes faster and protections were loosened as a result.

Over a two-year period, ORR could not reach about 85,000 children and reporting found that some of those children were working in jobs that are illegal for minors. During a series of congressional oversight hearings, federal disclosures revealed that a safety hotline managed by the Office of Refugee Resettlement for unaccompanied migrant children had failed to respond to more than 65,000 calls and safety reports between August 2023 and January 2025. Hannah Dreier's series covering the events, titled "Alone and Exploited," won the 2024 Pulitzer Prize for Investigative Reporting.

==== Additional matters ====
Becerra oversaw one of the biggest reform efforts of sub-agencies in HHS's history, including at the Food and Drug Administration and the Centers for Disease Control and Prevention.

Becerra was criticized as health and human services secretary for being absent in the public eye during the pandemic, for confusing messaging by federal public health authorities and for the subsequent loss of public trust, and for his collaborative management style while serving as secretary; his defenders said he was given an unclear role as secretary. Becerra was similarly criticized following his agency's response to the 2022 monkeypox outbreak amid issues with health policy communication and what was widely considered a slow response; White House officials said that Becerra sought to scapegoat the states rather than take responsibility for the subpar response.

In 2023, Becerra rejected cancer patients’ petition to use a law which allows HHS regulators to rescind exclusive patent protections for government-developed drugs making them more available to the generic market.

Becerra directed an overhaul of the national organ transplant system. In March 2023, the Health Resources and Services Administration announced a modernization initiative. The law ended the sole-source role that the United Network for Organ Sharing had held over the Organ Procurement and Transplantation Network since 1986.

== Governor of California ==
=== 2026 election ===
In the 2026 California gubernatorial election, Gavin Newsom was ineligible to run for reelection as governor due to term limits. In February 2024, Politico reported that Becerra was considering a run for governor, and that he or affiliated individuals had approached a political consulting firm about doing so. On April 2, 2025, Becerra declared his candidacy in the election. Three days after the primary election, on June 5, 2026, the Associated Press called Becerra as one of the top two candidates in the primary election who would advance to the general election in November. Becerra defeated Republican Steve Hilton in the general election. He is the first Latino elected governor of California; California's first Latino governor was Romualdo Pacheco, who went from lieutenant governor to governor in 1875 when governor Newton Booth was elected to the Senate.

In November 2025, Politico reported on a scheme in which Becerra's closest aides, including his chief of staff of 20 years and Governor Gavin Newsom's former chief of staff, had siphoned money from his campaign accounts for years. The total amount was reported to be $225,000 over two years. Although Becerra was not accused of wrongdoing, Politico reported that he was facing scrutiny as to how he had not known about the situation until federal investigators approached him. Becerra had previously faced criticism for suspected campaign finance violations; in 2024, it had been reported that he was paying $10,000 a month for campaign reporting from a dormant state account, an apparent Hatch Act violation. Becerra stated that the expenditures were for account maintenance, which political experts stated to be "a very high cost to pay."

=== Tenure ===
Becerra is expected to be sworn in as governor on January 4, 2027.

== Personal life ==
Becerra is married to physician Carolina Reyes, and they have three daughters. He is a member of the Inter-American Dialogue think tank, based in Washington, D.C. Becerra is Roman Catholic.

== Electoral history ==
=== California State Assembly ===
1990 California State Assembly 59th district election
Primary election
Party	Candidate	Votes	%
Democratic	Xavier Becerra	9,098	34.80
Democratic	Marta Maestas	7,352	28.12
Democratic	Diane Martinez	6,703	25.64
Democratic	Larry Salazar	1,509	5.77
Democratic	Bill Hernandez	1,482	5.67
Total votes		26,144	100%
General election
Democratic	Xavier Becerra	34,650	60.87
Republican	Lee Lieberg	19,938	35.03
Libertarian	Steven Pencall	2,331	4.10
Total votes		56,919	100%
Democratic hold			

=== U.S. House of Representatives ===
1992 United States House of Representatives in California, District 30
Primary election
Party	Candidate	Votes	%
Democratic	Xavier Becerra	10,417	31.84
Democratic	Leticia Quezada	7,089	21.67
Democratic	Albert C. Lum	5,128	15.68
Democratic	Jeff J. Penichet	4,136	12.64
Democratic	Gonzalo Molina	2,320	7.09
Democratic	Helen Hernandez	1,908	5.83
Democratic	Roland R. Mora	611	1.87
Democratic	Esca W. Smith	444	1.36
Democratic	Mark Calney	336	1.03
Democratic	Ysidro "Sid" Molina	325	0.99
Total votes		32,714	100%
General election
Democratic	Xavier Becerra	48,800	58.41
Republican	Morry Waksberg	20,034	23.98
Green	Blase Bonpane	6,315	7.56
Peace and Freedom	Elizabeth A. Nakano	6,173	7.39
Libertarian	Andrew "Drew" Consalvo	2,221	2.66
Total votes		83,543	100%
Democratic hold			

1994 United States House of Representatives in California, District 30
Primary election
Party	Candidate	Votes	%
Democratic	Xavier Becerra (incumbent)	18,790	81.51
Democratic	Leticia Quezada	4,263	18.49
Total votes		23,053	100%
General election
Democratic	Xavier Becerra (incumbent)	43,943	66.15
Republican	David A. Ramirez	18,741	28.21
Libertarian	R. William Weilberg	3,741	5.63
Total votes		66,425	100%
Democratic hold			

1996 United States House of Representatives in California, District 30
Primary election
Party	Candidate	Votes	%
Democratic	Xavier Becerra (incumbent)	21,310	100
Total votes		21,310	100%
General election
Democratic	Xavier Becerra (incumbent)	58,283	72.32
Republican	Patricia Parker	15,078	18.71
Libertarian	Pam Probst	2,759	3.42
Peace and Freedom	Shirley Mandel	2,499	3.10
Natural Law	Rosemary Watson-Frith	1,971	2.45
Total votes		80,590	100%
Democratic hold			

1998 United States House of Representatives in California, District 30
Primary election
Party	Candidate	Votes	%
Democratic	Xavier Becerra (incumbent)	38,925	100
Total votes		38,925	100%
General election
Democratic	Xavier Becerra (incumbent)	58,230	81.25
Republican	Patricia Parker	13,441	18.75
Total votes		71,671	100%
Democratic hold			

2000 United States House of Representatives in California, District 30
Primary election
Party	Candidate	Votes	%
Democratic	Xavier Becerra (incumbent)	53,145	100
Total votes		53,145	100%
General election
Democratic	Xavier Becerra (incumbent)	83,223	83.29
Republican	Tony Goss	11,788	11.80
Libertarian	Jason E. Heath	2,858	2.86
Natural Law	Gary D. Hearne	2,051	2.05
Total votes		99,920	100%
Democratic hold			

2002 United States House of Representatives in California, District 31
Primary election
Party	Candidate	Votes	%
Democratic	Xavier Becerra (incumbent)	24,231	100
Total votes		24,231	100%
General election
Democratic	Xavier Becerra (incumbent)	54,569	81.15
Republican	Luis Vega	12,674	18.85
Total votes		67,243	100%
Democratic hold			

2004 United States House of Representatives in California, District 31
Primary election
Party	Candidate	Votes	%
Democratic	Xavier Becerra (incumbent)	26,308	89.45
Democratic	Mervin Leon Evans	3,103	10.55
Total votes		29,411	100%
General election
Democratic	Xavier Becerra (incumbent)	89,363	80.21
Republican	Luis Vega	22,048	19.79
Total votes		111,411	100%
Democratic hold			

2006 United States House of Representatives in California, District 31
Primary election
Party	Candidate	Votes	%
Democratic	Xavier Becerra (incumbent)	26,904	89.29
Democratic	Mervin Leon Evans	3,227	10.71
Total votes		30,131	100%
General election
Democratic	Xavier Becerra (incumbent)	64,952	100
Total votes		64,952	100%
Democratic hold			

2008 United States House of Representatives in California, District 31
Primary election
Party	Candidate	Votes	%
Democratic	Xavier Becerra (incumbent)	18,127	100
Total votes		18,127	100%
General election
Democratic	Xavier Becerra (incumbent)	110,955	100
Total votes		110,955	100%
Democratic hold			

2010 United States House of Representatives in California, District 31
Primary election
Party	Candidate	Votes	%
Democratic	Xavier Becerra (incumbent)	20,550	88.03
Democratic	Sal Genovese	2,795	11.97
Total votes		23,345	100%
General election
Democratic	Xavier Becerra (incumbent)	76,363	83.82
Republican	Stephen Carlton Smith	14,740	16.08
Democratic	Sal Genovese (write-in)	3	0.00
Total votes		91,106	100%
Democratic hold			

2012 United States House of Representatives in California, District 34
Primary election
Party	Candidate	Votes	%
Democratic	Xavier Becerra (incumbent)	27,939	77.43
Democratic	Stephen C. Smith	5,793	16.01
Peace and Freedom	Howard Johnson	2,407	6.67%
Total votes		36,085	100%
General election
Democratic	Xavier Becerra (incumbent)	120,367	85.62
Democratic	Stephen Carlton Smith	20,223	14.38
Total votes		140,590	100%
Democratic hold			

2014 United States House of Representatives in California, District 34
Primary election
Party	Candidate	Votes	%
Democratic	Xavier Becerra (incumbent)	22,878	73.83
Democratic	Adrienne Nicole Edwards	4,473	14.44
Peace and Freedom	Howard Johnson	3,587	11.58
No party preference	Jonathan Turner Smith (write-in)	48	0.15
Total votes		30,986	100%
General election
Democratic	Xavier Becerra (incumbent)	44,697	72.54
Democratic	Adrienne Nicole Edwards	16,924	27.46
Total votes		61,621	100%
Democratic hold			

2016 United States House of Representatives in California, District 34
Primary election
Party	Candidate	Votes	%
Democratic	Xavier Becerra (incumbent)	71,982	77.58
Democratic	Adrienne Nicole Edwards	19,624	21.15
Democratic	Kenneth Mejia (write-in)	1,177	1.26
Total votes		92,783	100%
General election
Democratic	Xavier Becerra (incumbent)	122,842	77.18
Democratic	Adrienne Nicole Edwards	36,314	22.82
Total votes		159,156	100%
Democratic hold			

=== California Attorney General ===
2018 California Attorney General election
Primary election
Party	Candidate	Votes	%
Democratic	Xavier Becerra (incumbent)	3,024,611	45.82
Republican	Steven C. Bailey	1,615,859	24.48
Democratic	Dave Jones	1,017,427	15.41
Republican	Eric Early	943,017	14.29
Total votes		6,600,914	100%
General election
Democratic	Xavier Becerra (incumbent)	7,790,743	63.57
Republican	Steven C. Bailey	4,465,587	36.43
Total votes		12,256,330	100%
Democratic hold			

== See also ==
- List of first minority male lawyers and judges in California
- List of Hispanic and Latino Americans in the United States Congress

== Notes ==
U.S. House of Representatives
Preceded by Marty Martínez	Member of the U.S. House of Representatives from California's 30th congressional district 1993–2003	Succeeded by Henry Waxman
Preceded by Ed Pastor	Chair of the Congressional Hispanic Caucus; 1997–1999	Succeeded by Lucille Roybal-Allard
Preceded by Hilda Solis	Member of the U.S. House of Representatives from California's 31st congressional district 2003–2013	Succeeded by Gary Miller
Preceded by Lucille Roybal-Allard	Member of the U.S. House of Representatives from California's 34th congressional district 2013–2017	Succeeded by Jimmy Gomez
Party political offices
Preceded by John Spratt	House Democratic Assistant to the Leader; 2007–2009	Succeeded by Chris Van Hollen
Preceded by John Larson	Vice Chair of the House Democratic Conference; 2009–2013	Succeeded by Joe Crowley
Preceded by John Larson	Chair of the House Democratic Conference; 2013–2017	Succeeded by Joe Crowley
Preceded by Gavin Newsom	Democratic nominee for Governor of California; 2026	Most recent
Legal offices
Preceded by Kathleen Kenealy; Acting	Attorney General of California; 2017–2021	Succeeded by Matt Rodriquez; Acting
Political offices
Preceded by Alex Azar	United States Secretary of Health and Human Services; 2021–2025	Succeeded by Robert F. Kennedy Jr.
Preceded by Gavin Newsom	Governor of California; Taking office 2027	Elect
U.S. order of precedence (ceremonial)
Preceded by Deb Haaland as Former U.S. Cabinet Member	Order of precedence of the United States as Former U.S. Cabinet Member	Succeeded by Marty Walsh as Former U.S. Cabinet Member
