= Rob Bonta =

American politician (born 1971)

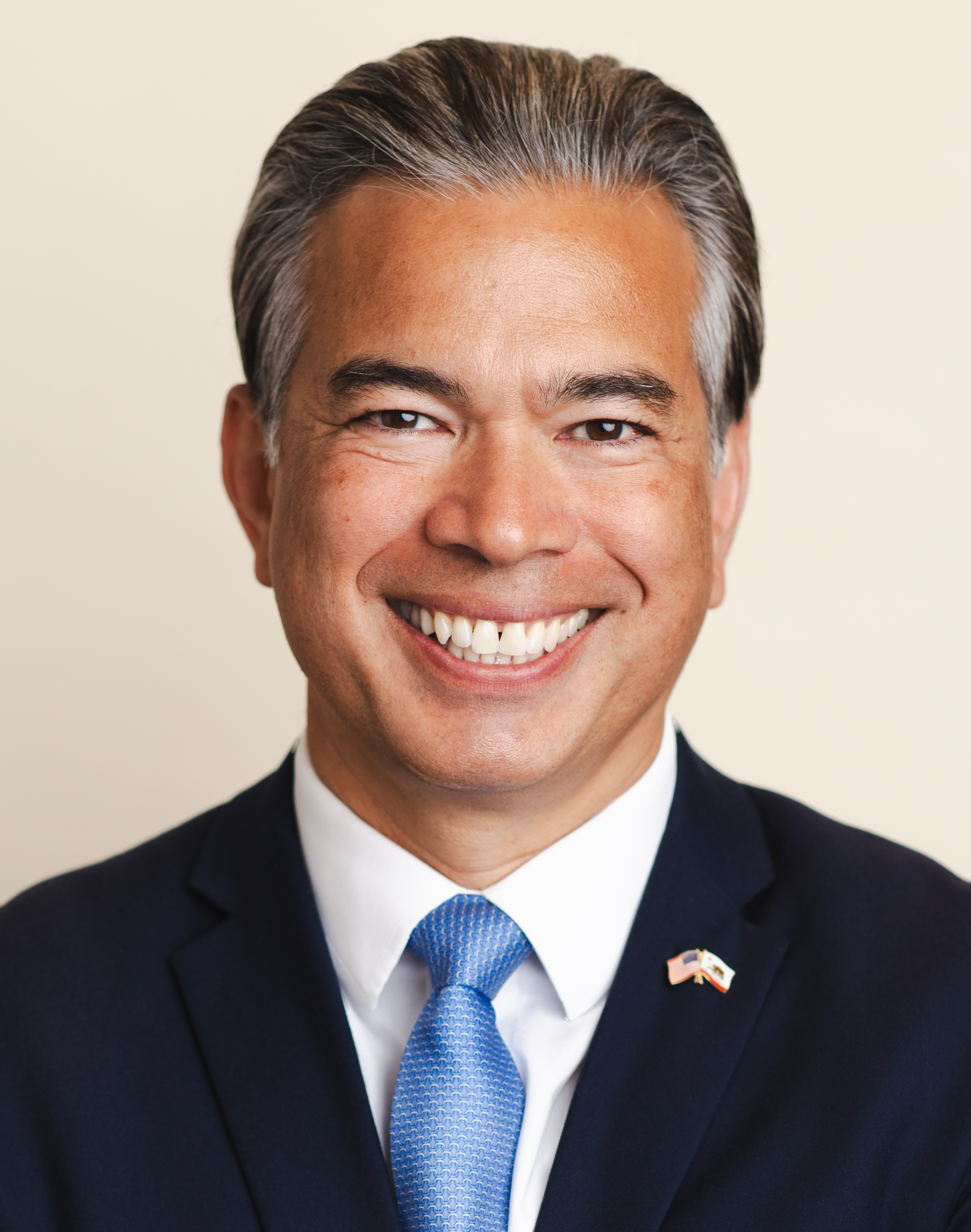
- Official portrait, 2023

34th Attorney General of California
- Incumbent
- Assumed office April 23, 2021
- Governor: Gavin Newsom; Xavier Becerra (elect)
- Preceded by: Xavier Becerra (Note: Matthew Rodriquez (acting))

Member of the California State Assembly from the 18th district
- In office December 3, 2012 – April 22, 2021
- Preceded by: Mary Hayashi
- Succeeded by: Mia Bonta

Member of the Alameda City Council
- In office December 21, 2010 – November 20, 2012
- Preceded by: Frank Matarrese
- Succeeded by: Marilyn Ezzy Ashcraft

Personal details
- Born: Robert Andres Bonta; September 22, 1971 (age 55) Quezon City, Philippines
- Party: Democratic
- Spouse: Mia Villafañe (m. 1997)
- Children: 3, including Reina
- Education: Yale University (BA, JD); University of Oxford (attended)
- Website: Office website Campaign website

Robert Andres Bonta (born September 22, 1971) (Note: An October 1971 newspaper article reported that Robert Andres Bonta was born in Quezon City, Philippines, on September 22 of that year. Additionally, several news reports from his appointment as attorney general in April 2021 stated his age as 49, which would match a September 1971 birthdate. However, some sources have claimed September 22, 1972, as his date of birth.) is a Filipino-born, American lawyer and politician who has served as the 34th attorney general of California since 2021. A member of the Democratic Party, he previously served as a member of the California State Assembly for the 18th district from 2012 to 2021 and as a member of the Alameda City Council from 2010 to 2012.

The first Filipino American to serve in the California State Legislature, Bonta chaired the California Asian & Pacific Islander Legislative Caucus. After Xavier Becerra resigned as attorney general to become Secretary of Health and Human Services, Bonta was appointed by Governor Gavin Newsom to replace him. Bonta was sworn in on April 23, 2021, becoming the first Filipino American to hold the office. Bonta was elected to a full four-year term in office in 2022 and reelected in 2026.

== Early life and education ==
Robert Andres Bonta was born on September 22, 1971, in Quezon City, Philippines, where his parents were working as Christian missionaries. Bonta immigrated with his family to California later in 1971, as an infant.

The Bonta family initially lived in a trailer at Nuestra Señora Reina de la Paz, the United Farm Workers headquarters near Keene, California, before moving north to Fair Oaks, a suburb of Sacramento. At Bella Vista High School, Bonta was a soccer player and graduated as class valedictorian.

Bonta then attended Yale University, where he graduated cum laude with a B.A. in history in 1993 and played on the Yale Bulldogs men's soccer team. After completing his undergraduate studies, Bonta attended the University of Oxford for one year studying politics, philosophy, and economics. In 1995, Bonta enrolled at Yale Law School and graduated with a Juris Doctor in 1998.

== Early career ==
=== Legal career ===
After his year at Oxford, Bonta returned to New Haven to attend Yale Law School while concurrently working as site coordinator at nonprofit organization Leadership, Education, and Athletics in Partnership (LEAP), where he developed policy and managed activities for 30 staff members and 100 children for an organization serving the Church Street South neighborhood. Bonta was admitted to the California State Bar in 1999.

From 1998 to 1999, Bonta clerked for Judge Alvin W. Thompson of the United States District Court for the District of Connecticut. Bonta then returned to California to be a litigation associate with San Francisco law firm Keker & Van Nest. Working at Keker & Van Nest from 1999 to 2003, Bonta practiced in a variety of areas including civil rights, crime, insurance, patent infringement, legal malpractice, contract, and fraud. As a private attorney, Bonta was part of a team that worked with the ACLU to implement new protocols to prevent racial profiling by the California Highway Patrol.

==== San Francisco City Attorney's office ====
From 2003 to 2012, Bonta was a Deputy City Attorney of San Francisco under Dennis Herrera. During his tenure, Bonta represented the City of San Francisco in a lawsuit filed by Kelly Medora, a pre-school teacher who accused a San Francisco Police Department officer of using excessive force during a jaywalking arrest. The officer, Christopher Damonte, broke the woman’s arm. Damonte was later fired for a separate incident.

Bonta, as the assigned attorney by the City Attorney's Office, argued for the city that Medora and her friends put themselves and others in danger by walking on the street and were warned to leave by Damonte and another officer. The city eventually settled the lawsuit for $235,000 in May 2008.

In 2009, Bonta argued on behalf of San Francisco, defending its strip search policy in jails by asserting that concerns about smuggling of drugs and weapons at a main city jail presented reasonable basis for strip searches. The United States Court of Appeals for the Ninth Circuit ruled 6–5 in favor of the strip search policy in February 2010.

=== Alameda City Council ===
Bonta was elected to Alameda City Council in November 2010. He was sworn in on December 21, 2010, and appointed vice mayor the same day. Within a year, he declared his intent to run for state assembly. In 2012, some Alameda residents started a recall campaign against him but the effort never qualified for the ballot, with Bonta winning election to the state assembly in November 2012. The final city council meeting during which he was a member of the city council was on November 20, 2012.

== California State Assembly ==
Bonta was elected to represent the 18th district in the California State Assembly in the 2012 election. He was reelected in the 2014, 2016, 2018, and 2020 elections. In February 2021, CalMatters reported that Bonta had regularly solicited donations, also known as "behested payments", from companies with business before California's legislature for his wife's nonprofit organization.

=== Tenure ===
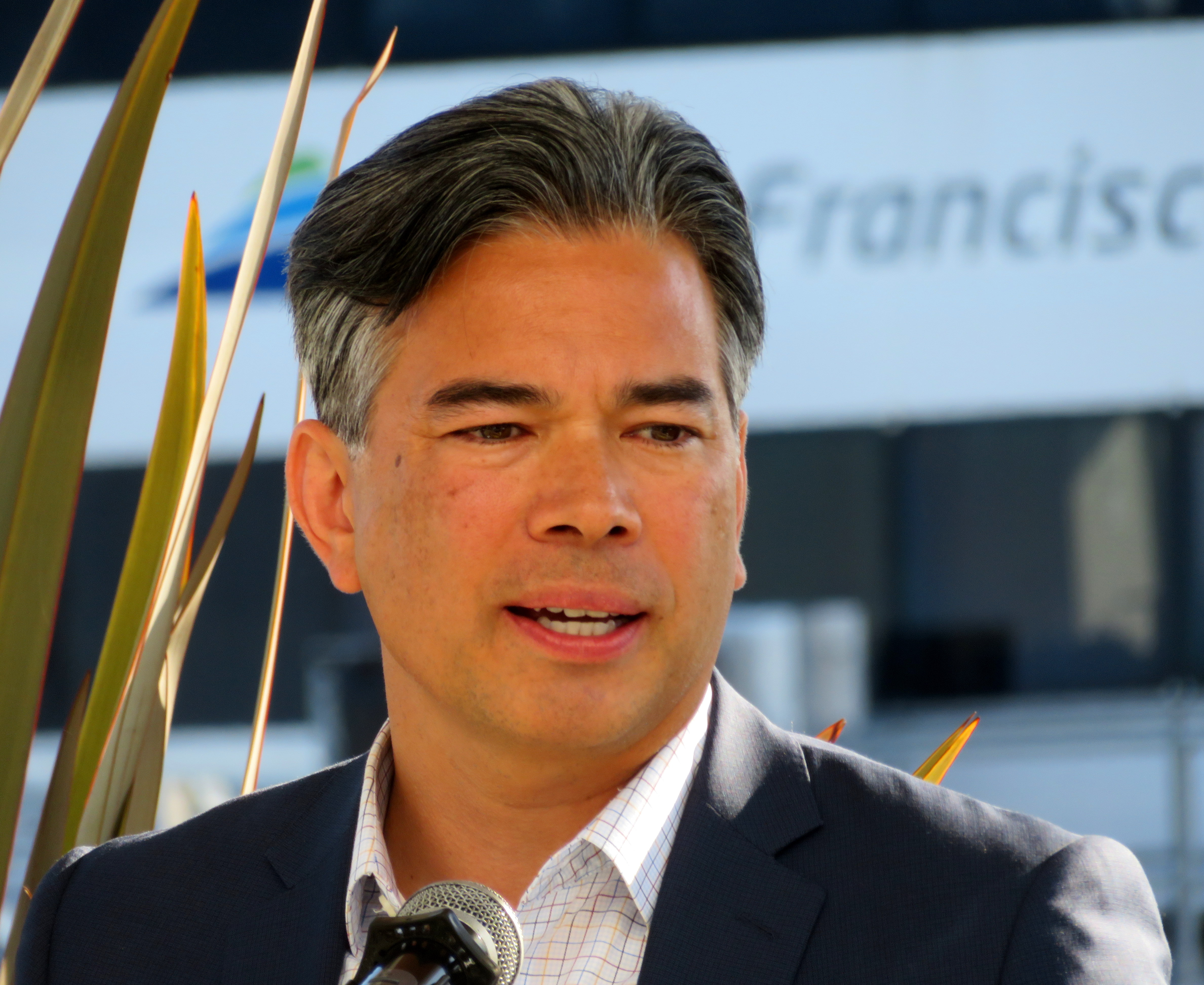
Bonta in December 2018

==== Healthcare and housing policy ====
As a member of the state assembly, Bonta authored major changes to California's penal code, as well as immigration, health care, and housing law. Bonta authored legislation in 2016 to outlaw balance billing by hospitals in order to help consumers avoid surprise medical bills. Brown signed the bill into law September 2016.

Bonta introduced Assembly Bill 1481 in 2019, which sought to outlaw baseless evictions and mandate landlords demonstrate "just cause" in order to evict residential tenants. The bill was combined with a statewide cap on rent increases and other rental proposals into a single piece of legislation. That bill, Assembly Bill 1482, was passed by the California Legislature and signed by Newsom in October 2019.

==== Civil rights ====
Bonta introduced legislation in January 2013 that would require California public schools, as funding is available, to teach students "the role of immigrants, including Filipino Americans" in the farm labor movement. It was signed into law in October of that same year by Jerry Brown. Bonta's mother, Cynthia Bonta, helped organize Filipino and Mexican American farmworkers for the United Farm Workers.

Bonta introduced legislation to repeal a McCarthy-era ban on Communist Party members holding government jobs in California. The bill received criticism from Republicans, veteran groups and Vietnamese Americans, with Republican Assemblyman Travis Allen calling it "blatantly offensive to all Californians." After passing the State Assembly, the legislation was later withdrawn.

==== Criminal justice reform ====
Bonta and State Senator Robert Hertzberg co-authored Senate Bill 10, which when passed, made California the first state in the nation to eliminate money bail for suspects awaiting trial and replace it with a risk-assessment system. On August 28, 2018, Governor Jerry Brown signed the bill into law.

Bonta introduced legislation to end the use of for-profit, private prisons and detention facilities in California. Signed in 2019 by Gavin Newsom, AB 32 made California the first state in the nation to ban both private prisons and civil detention centers.

Bonta joined Assemblymember Kevin McCarty and other colleagues in 2019 as a lead author of Assembly Bill 1506, a bill to mandate an independent review of officers involved in shootings in California by the California Department of Justice. The bill was signed into law in September 2020 by Newsom.

Following the murder of George Floyd and a July 2020 incident in Central Park involving a white woman calling 9-1-1 to report a black man who asked her to obey park rules, Bonta introduced legislation that would criminalize knowingly making a false call to the police based on someone's race, religion, or gender.

== Attorney General of California ==
On March 24, 2021, Governor Gavin Newsom announced that he would be appointing Bonta as Attorney General of California to succeed Xavier Becerra, who had resigned the position to become Secretary of Health and Human Services under President Joe Biden.

Bonta's appointment was praised by prominent state Democrats including Toni Atkins, the president pro tempore of the state senate, and U.S. Representative Adam Schiff. He assumed office on April 23, 2021, becoming the first Filipino-American to serve as California Attorney General.

=== Tenure ===
==== Criminal justice policy ====
After taking office, Bonta launched an independent review into the 2020 shooting of Sean Monterrosa by police in Vallejo, Solano County. In August 2021, Bonta announced an independent review of the 2009 killing of Oscar Grant by BART Police officer Johannes Mehserle.

==== Tech policy ====
In 2022, Bonta expressed concern that the American Data Privacy and Protection Act would preempt the California Privacy Rights Act and inhibit state officials' ability to enforce data privacy regulations.

In September 2022, Bonta filed an antitrust lawsuit against Amazon, accusing the e-commerce giant of unlawfully stifling price competition. Amazon's effort to have the lawsuit dismissed was rejected by a judge in March 2023. In January 2023, Bonta and attorneys general from seven other states joined the Department of Justice in filing an antitrust lawsuit against Google's advertising technology (adtech) market practices.

==== Housing policy ====
As California Attorney General, Bonta has responsibility for enforcing the provisions of the California Housing Opportunity and More Efficiency (HOME) Act, often known as Senate Bill 9 or "SB9". Passed in 2021, the legislation aims to solve the state housing shortage crisis by changing state zoning law to allow for the construction of more units.

In 2022, Bonta intervened after the city of Woodside controversially claimed it is the site of a cougar habitat and should be granted an exception under SB9. In response, Bonta noted that "SB9 does not allow for entire towns or cities to be declared off limits" from the law, and that exceptions require "a parcel specific inquiry". The city of Woodside later abandoned its effort to seek an exception under SB9.

==== 2022 data breach controversy ====
In June 2022, Bonta released an online dashboard containing data on firearms in what he said was an effort to improve transparency and increase public trust. The site was taken down the following day after a vulnerability on the site inadvertently exposed sensitive information about concealed-carry weapon permit holders. Bonta condemned the incident, saying, it was "unacceptable and falls short of...expectations for this department", and that he was "deeply disturbed and angered", while his office said it was investigating how much information might have been exposed.

According to The Wall Street Journal, data from the gun violence restraining dashboards were leaked, as was data from the assault weapon registry and dashboards pertaining to handgun certification, records of sale, and gun safety. The breach exposed personal data that included names, dates of birth, gender and race, driver’s license number, addresses, and criminal history.

The California Rifle & Pistol Association said the breach "put the lives of judges, prosecutors, domestic violence victims and everyday citizens at risk" and gave criminals "a map to their homes". The leak happened days after the Supreme Court struck down New York's concealed carry permit system in New York State Rifle & Pistol Association, Inc. v. Bruen.

==== NFL investigation ====
On May 4, 2023, Bonta and his New York counterpart Letitia James announced they would jointly investigate the National Football League over employment practices at its offices in New York City and Los Angeles, citing a report by The New York Times detailing complaints of harassment and discrimination made by former female staffers.

==== "Abortion pill reversal" lawsuit ====
On September 21, 2023, Bonta filed a lawsuit against crisis pregnancy centers Heartbeat International and RealOptions, claiming they made "fraudulent and misleading claims" about the efficacy of "abortion pill reversal", which uses high doses of progesterone to attempt to counteract the effects of mifepristone. Bonta stated that the companies are aware there is no scientific evidence the process works, and failed to alert patients to possible side effects.

==== xAI deepfake investigation ====
On January 16, 2026, Bonta announced an investigation into xAI, owner of social media service X, over the large-scale use of artificial intelligence to create nonconsensual sexual images and child sexual abuse material.

==== Gender-affirming care lawsuit ====
On January 30, 2026, Bonta filed a lawsuit against Rady Children's Health for ending its gender-affirming care program for patients under the age of 19 in compliance with Trump administration policies on transgender healthcare. The lawsuit alleges that the decision violates conditions of the hospital's 2024 merger with Children's Hospital of Orange County.

==== Altadena Eaton Canyon Fire ====
In February 2026, Rob Bonta, announced a civil rights investigation into the emergency response to the 2025 Eaton Fire, focusing on potential disparities affecting the historically Black community of West Altadena. The investigation seeks to determine whether race, age, or disability discrimination influenced evacuation warnings or other aspects of the response. According to the California Department of Justice, the fire burned more than 14,000 acres, destroyed thousands of structures, and resulted in at least 19 fatalities.

==== Cardroom regulation litigation ====
In February 2026, Attorney General Rob Bonta and the California Gaming Association engaged in a legal dispute over proposed regulations that sought to ban blackjack and other table games at private cardrooms. The restrictions received pushback from cardrooms and local municipalities, which argued the rules would severely damage local government revenues.

The San Francisco Superior Court struck down the proposed rules, ruling that the Department of Justice's Bureau of Gambling Control overstepped its statutory authority under the California Gambling Control Act. The ruling prompted an appeal process from the state.

==== Second Trump presidency ====
During the first year of the second Trump presidency, Bonta filed 54 lawsuits against the administration.

=== Elections and political future ===
In the 2022 election, Bonta chose to run for a full term as attorney general. Bonta won an absolute 54.3% majority in the June 2022 primary election, and defeated Republican Nathan Hochman, a former U.S. Assistant Attorney General, with 59.1% in the general election.

Following U.S. Senator Dianne Feinstein's decision to retire and not seek reelection in the 2024 Senate election, Bonta was mentioned as a potential Senate candidate. However, Bonta declined to run, and co-endorsed the campaigns of U.S. Representatives Barbara Lee and Katie Porter.

2022 Attorney General election
Primary election
Party	Candidate	Votes	%
Democratic	Rob Bonta (incumbent)	3,756,486	54.3
Republican	Nathan Hochman	1,256,465	18.2
Republican	Eric Early	1,142,747	16.5
No party preference	Anne Marie Schubert	539,746	7.8
Green	Dan Kapelovitz	219,912	3.2
Total votes		6,915,356	100.0
General election
Democratic	Rob Bonta (incumbent)	6,339,436	59.1
Republican	Nathan Hochman	4,390,424	40.9
Total votes		10,729,860	100.0
Democratic hold			

== Political career and controversies ==
In August 2022, Attorney General Bonta announced a settlement with Sephora resolving allegations that the retailer violated the California Consumer Privacy Act. The settlement required Sephora to pay $1.2 million and change its practices concerning disclosure of personal-information sales and consumers' requests to opt out.

In September 2024, the San Francisco Chronicle reported that Bonta had helped secure a $3.4 million state grant for Viridis Fuels while serving in the Assembly. Approximately $700,000 had been spent, but the proposed biodiesel plant remained unbuilt.

In February 2023, Assembly member Mia Bonta recused herself from matters involving the Department of Justice budget after concerns arose about her role chairing a subcommittee overseeing her husband's department. She maintained that no legal or ethical conflict existed but said that the recusal would preserve public confidence in the legislative process.

== Personal life ==
Bonta's wife, Mia Bonta, is a member of the California State Assembly and was elected in a 2021 special election to fill her husband's vacant seat. She previously served as the president of the Alameda Unified School District. She and Bonta have three children. Their daughter, Reina, is a filmmaker and plays soccer for the Brazilian club Santos FC, which competes in the Brasileirão Feminino, and the Philippines national team.

== See also ==
- List of first minority male lawyers and judges in California

== Notes ==
Legal offices
Preceded by Matt Rodriquez; Acting	Attorney General of California; 2021–present	Incumbent
