= Stephen Reinhardt =

American judge (1931–2018)

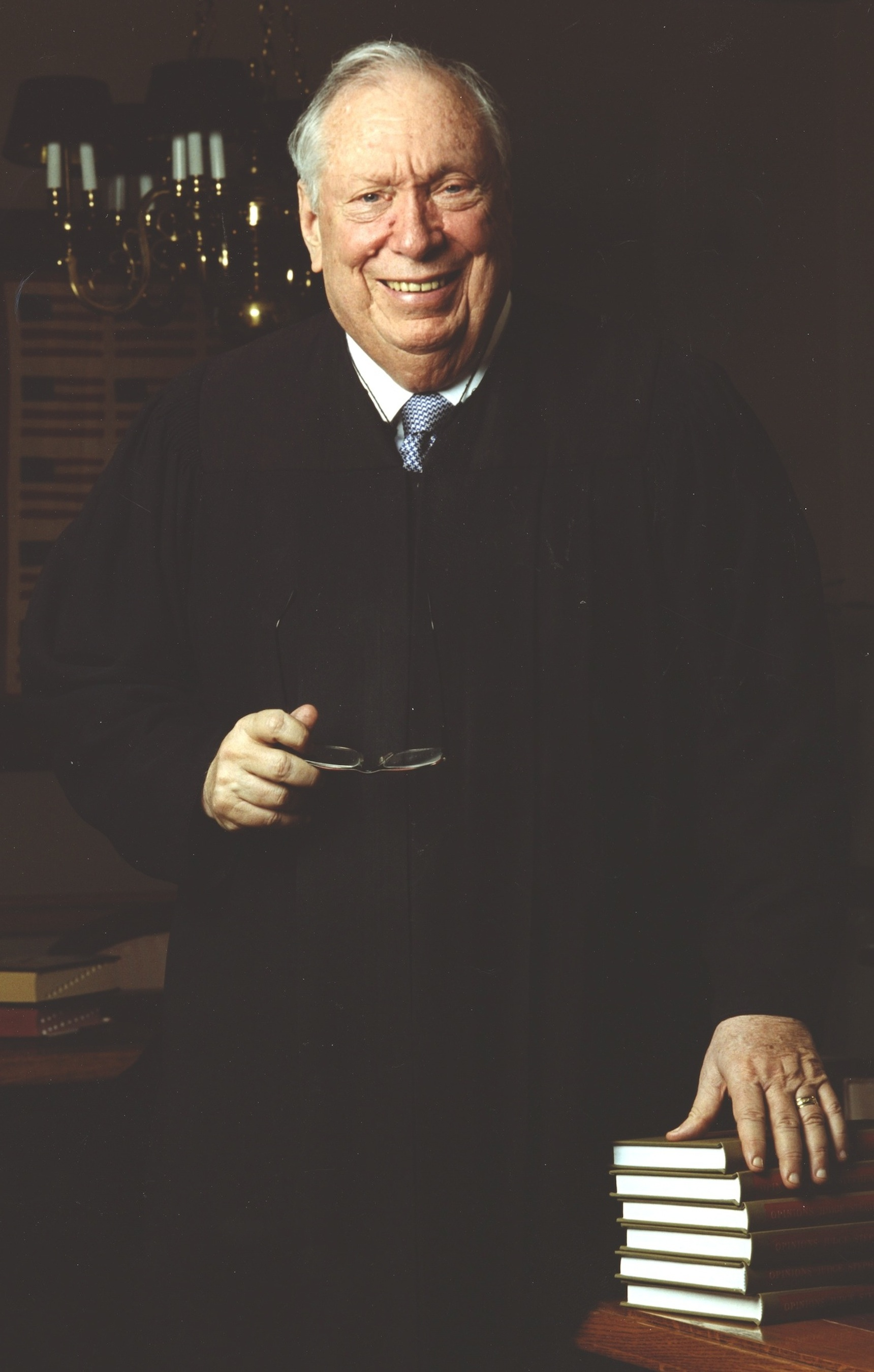

Judge of the United States Court of Appeals for the Ninth Circuit
- In office September 11, 1980 – March 29, 2018
- Appointed by: Jimmy Carter
- Preceded by: Seat established by 92 Stat. 1629
- Succeeded by: Kenneth K. Lee

Personal details
- Born: Stephen Roy Shapiro; March 27, 1931 New York City, New York, U.S.
- Died: March 29, 2018 (aged 87) Los Angeles, California, U.S.
- Party: Democratic
- Education: Pomona College (AB); Yale University (LLB)

Stephen Roy Reinhardt (né Shapiro; March 27, 1931 – March 29, 2018) was a United States circuit judge of the United States Court of Appeals for the Ninth Circuit, with chambers in Los Angeles, California. He was the last federal appeals court judge in active service to have been appointed to his position by President Jimmy Carter. (Note: José A. Cabranes, appointed to a district court by President Carter, left active service in 2023 as an appeals court judge by appointment of Bill Clinton.)

== Early life and career ==
Reinhardt was born Stephen Roy Shapiro into a Jewish family in New York City, to lawyer Samuel Shapiro, and Silvia Handelsman. Reinhardt changed his name after his mother divorced his father and married film director and producer Gottfried Reinhardt. Reinhardt graduated from University High School in Los Angeles. He enrolled in Pomona College and graduated three years later with a Bachelor of Arts degree in government in 1951. In 1954, he received a Bachelor of Laws from Yale Law School.

After law school, Reinhardt worked at the legal counsel's office for the United States Air Force as a lieutenant in Washington, D.C. Two years later, he clerked for United States District Judge Luther Youngdahl, a former governor of Minnesota, of the United States District Court for the District of Columbia. He then entered private practice, working for the law firm O'Melveny & Myers from 1958 to 1959 practicing entertainment law. After two years at O'Melveny, he began working at a small firm in Los Angeles that became Fogel, Julber, Reinhardt, Rothschild & Feldman, specializing in labor law.

Reinhardt served as a member of the United States Commission on Civil Rights, California Advisory Committee from 1962 to 1974 and was its vice chairman from 1969 to 1974. He also served as member of the Democratic National Committee and as an unpaid advisor to former Los Angeles mayor Tom Bradley and California governor Jerry Brown. In 1975, he was appointed to the Los Angeles Police Commission, which he chaired from 1978 until his judicial confirmation in 1980.

== Federal judicial service ==
Reinhardt was nominated by President Jimmy Carter on November 30, 1979, to the United States Court of Appeals for the Ninth Circuit, to a new seat authorized by 92 Stat. 1629. He was confirmed by the United States Senate on September 11, 1980, and received his commission on September 11, 1980. His service terminated on March 29, 2018, due to his death.

== Other service ==
Reinhardt continued his public service as Secretary of the 1984 Los Angeles Olympic Organizing Committee and as a member of the Board of Directors of the Los Angeles Amateur Athletic Foundation.

Reinhardt administered the oath of office to former Los Angeles Mayor Antonio Villaraigosa on July 1, 2005.

== Personal life ==
Reinhardt's mother divorced his father and married movie director Gottfried Reinhardt, the son of director Max Reinhardt. Stephen Reinhardt's first wife was Mary Wainwright, whom he married in 1956 and with whom he had three children. They divorced after nearly 25 years. His second wife was Maureen Kindel, who was president of the Los Angeles Board of Public Works in the 1980s. Later Reinhardt married Ramona Ripston, who was Executive Director of the ACLU of Southern California until her February 2011 retirement. They remained married until his death.

== Death ==
Reinhardt died in Los Angeles on March 29, 2018, from a heart attack, two days after his 87th birthday.

Chief Judge Sidney Runyan Thomas issued the following statement upon learning of Reinhardt's death:

All of us here at the Ninth Circuit are shocked and deeply saddened by Judge Reinhardt’s death. We have lost a great friend and colleague. As a judge, he was deeply principled, fiercely passionate about the law and fearless in his decisions. He will be remembered as one of the giants of the federal bench. He had a great life that ended much too soon.

== Posthumous controversy ==
Reinhardt was involved in a controversy after he died. Eleven judges of the Ninth Circuit heard oral argument in the case of Yovino v. Rizo. Reinhardt wrote an opinion on behalf of himself and five other judges, which was issued by the court 11 days after he died. A footnote at the beginning of the opinion stated: “Prior to his death, Judge Reinhardt fully participated in this case and authored this opinion. The majority opinion and all concurrences were final, and voting was completed by the en banc court prior to his death.”

The case was appealed to the Supreme Court, which vacated Reinhardt's opinion. The Supreme Court stated:

As for judicial practice, we are not aware of any rule or decision of the Ninth Circuit that renders judges’ votes and opinions immutable at some point in time prior to their public release. And it is generally understood that a judge may change his or her position up to the very moment when a decision is released. . . . Because Judge Reinhardt was no longer a judge at the time when the en banc decision in this case was filed, the Ninth Circuit erred in counting him as a member of the majority. That practice effectively allowed a deceased judge to exercise the judicial power of the United States after his death. But federal judges are appointed for life, not for eternity.

The Supreme Court remanded the case for further proceedings.

In 2020, after Judge Reinhardt's death, a staff attorney at the Center for Death Penalty Litigation in Durham, North Carolina testified before the Subcommittee on Courts, Intellectual Property, and the Internet that Judge Reinhardt had sexually harassed her while she worked for him as a law clerk; her testimony described her efforts to report the harassment.

== Judicial philosophy ==
Reinhardt was known as one of the most liberal judges on the courts of appeals. His decisions were "reversed more often than most" judges before the Supreme Court. In 2003, Reinhardt admitted that he "was a liberal from a very young age." "I think I was born that way", he said. However, he did not believe that a Supreme Court reversal meant that his opinion was wrong or that he did not follow the law. "The Supreme Court changes the law regularly. And this Supreme Court - which is the most activist Court there has ever been - is constantly changing the law. So if you really are faithful to the law, you're likely to get reversed because it [the Court] has cut back on rights." When pressed on the issue of his high reversal rate, he once stated "They can't catch 'em all".

His reversal rate did not affect his status as a feeder judge—between 2009 and 2013, he placed six of his clerks on the Supreme Court, tied for the tenth highest number during the same time period.

One of Reinhardt's former clerks, Cornell law professor Michael Dorf, said that when Reinhardt "believes himself clearly bound by Supreme Court precedent with which he disagrees, he states his disagreement but follows the precedent." Dorf accounts for Reinhardt's reversal rate by stating that "Reinhardt resolves cases under existing precedent as he believes those precedents should be read, without regard to whether five or more Justices of the Supreme Court are likely to reverse him."

Reinhardt rejected originalism, and believed the Constitution could bring justice to everyone, especially the underprivileged. Reinhardt was also a cynic and a pragmatist as well as a liberal. In Magana Ortiz v. Sessions (2017), Reinhardt admitted he could not stop a deportation, and said he had to allow it as a judge, although he would not as a citizen. Reinhardt also criticized the Trump administration in the opinion.

Examples of opinions that reversed Reinhardt's opinions include:

- Washington v. Glucksberg, 521 U.S. 702 (1997)
- Garcetti v. Ceballos, 547 U.S. 410 (2006)
- Gonzales v. Carhart, 550 U.S. 124 (2007)
- Garland v. Ming Dai, 593 U.S. 357 (2021)

== Notable opinions ==
The following are some of his more notable judicial opinions:

- Cardoza-Fonseca v. U.S. Immigration and Naturalization Service, 767 F.2d 1448 (9th Cir. 1985).

- The INS had conflated two different routes for seeking asylum and had improperly rejected an application made under one route based on the requirements of the second. This decision was upheld by the Supreme Court.

- Coleman v. Risley, 839 F.2d 434 (9th Cir. 1988).

- Standard to obtain asylum.

- Yniguez v. Arizonans for Official English, 939 F.2d 727 (9th Cir. 1991), adopted en banc, 69 F.3d 920 (9th Cir 1995).

- The English-only provision in the Arizona constitution was overly broad and violated the First Amendment right of free speech. This decision was vacated by the Supreme Court as moot because plaintiff Yniguez had voluntarily left the employment of the State of Arizona the day after the appeal was filed. 520 US 43. Justice Ginsburg's unanimous opinion for the Court also took a swipe at the Ninth Circuit for failing to certify this question to the state courts, holding that "A more cautious approach was in order. In addition, footnote 11 of Justice Ginsburg's opinion chided the Ninth Circuit for failing to recognize that state courts are not bound by decisions of federal courts (except the Supreme Court), even on questions of federal law.

- Sanders v. Ratelle, 21 F.3d 1446 (9th Cir. 1994).

- The Sixth Amendment right to counsel can be infringed if counsel has a conflict of interest, even if the defendant has waived the conflict.

- Compassion in Dying v. Washington, 79 F.3d 790 (9th Cir. 1996) (en banc).

- A statute prohibiting doctors from prescribing life-ending medication for the terminally ill violated the Due Process Clause of the Fourteenth Amendment. The Supreme Court reversed the Ninth Circuit in Washington v. Glucksberg (1997).

- Ma v. Reno, 208 F.3d 815 (9th Cir. 2000).

- An alien cannot be held indefinitely in detention in the absence of a repatriation agreement with his or her country of origin.

- Silveira v. Lockyer, 312 F.3d 1052 (9th Cir. 2002).

- The right to bear arms is a collective right, not an individual right. This ruling was overruled by the Supreme Court in D.C. v. Heller (2008).

- United States v. Approximately 64,695 Pounds of Shark Fins (9th Cir. 2008)

- Forfeiture of the shark fins was denied on the grounds that, although according to the Shark Finning Prohibition Act of 2000, any shark fins found aboard a fishing vessel without a corresponding shark carcass may be deemed the product of illegal harvesting, the vessel from which the fins were seized was not in fact a fishing vessel within the meaning of the act. The fins had been harvested by, and bought from, other vessels.

- In The Matter of Brad Levenson (2009)

- In his role as Chair of the Ninth Circuit’s Standing Committee on Federal Public Defenders, Reinhardt ruled that the application of the Defense of Marriage Act in denying health insurance benefits to Levenson's same-sex spouse violated the Due Process Clause of the Fifth Amendment.

- Perry v. Brown (2012)

- Writing for the majority, Reinhardt held that Proposition 8 violated the Equal Protection Clause because California had no rational basis for withdrawing the right to marry from homosexual men and women.

- Cooper v. Brown, 565 F.3d 581 (2009).

- Reinhardt wrote a dissenting opinion, where he suggested the Ninth Circuit disclose the names of judges who vote for and against en banc rehearing of cases.

- Hernandez v. Chappell (December 29, 2017)

- Reinhardt ruled that Hernandez was mentally ill and therefore could not be executed. Overturned by the Ninth Circuit in 2019.

== Awards ==
Reinhardt received the following awards:

- 1987 Appellate Judge of the Year by the California Trial Lawyers Association
- 1993 St. Thomas More Medallion Award by Loyola Law School
- 1993 Donald Wright Award by the California Attorneys for Criminal Justice
- 1995 Appellate Justice of the Year by the Consumer Attorneys Association of Los Angeles
- 1998 Champion of Justice: Legal Award by the National Association of Criminal Defense Lawyers
- 2004 Award for Judicial Excellence by the Idaho Association of Criminal Defense Lawyers
- 2004 Meritorious Service Award by the University of Oregon Law School

== See also ==
- List of United States federal judges by longevity of service

== Notes ==
Legal offices
Preceded by Seat established by 92 Stat. 1629	Judge of the United States Court of Appeals for the Ninth Circuit; 1980–2018	Succeeded by Kenneth K. Lee
