= Caniglia v. Strom =

2021 United States Supreme Court case

- Supreme Court of the United States

Argued March 24, 2021 Decided May 17, 2021
- Full case name: Edward A. Caniglia v. Robert F. Strom, et al.
- Docket no.: 20-157
- Citations: 593 U.S. 194 (more) 141 S. Ct. 1596; 209 L. Ed. 2d 604

Case history
- Prior: Summary judgment granted, Caniglia v. Strom, 396 F. Supp. 3d 227 (D.R.I. 2019); Affirmed, 953 F.3d 112 (1st Cir. 2020); Cert. granted, 141 S. Ct. 870 (2020)

Holding
- There is no open-ended "community caretaking" exception to the Fourth Amendment's warrant requirement. Exigency must be shown.

Court membership
- Chief Justice John Roberts Associate Justices Clarence Thomas · Stephen Breyer; Samuel Alito · Sonia Sotomayor; Elena Kagan · Neil Gorsuch; Brett Kavanaugh · Amy Coney Barrett

Case opinions
- Majority: Thomas, joined by unanimous
- Concurrence: Roberts, joined by Breyer
- Concurrence: Alito
- Concurrence: Kavanaugh

Laws applied
- U.S. Const. amend. IV

Caniglia v. Strom, 593 U.S. 194 (2021), was a United States Supreme Court case related to the Fourth Amendment to the United States Constitution's "community caretaking" exception.

== Background ==
During a heated argument in their home on August 20, 2015, Edward Caniglia grabbed a pistol from a bedroom and threw it on the dining room table. He then asked his wife, Kim, to shoot him with the gun. Although whether the gun was loaded or not was in dispute, Kim hid the gun and the magazine while Edward left for a "ride" after the fight due to concern for his mental condition. As conflict brewed up after Edward returned home, Kim stayed at a hotel. At the hotel, she phoned a furious Edward that night, who brought up topics from the fight. The next day, Kim was unable to reach Edward through any means of contact. She then decided to contact the Cranston, Rhode Island Police Department's non-emergency line because Kim feared he harmed himself after the tirades. Talking with Officer Mastrati, she mentioned the argument, Edward's behavior, and the firearm. Kim clarified that she was not in danger but worried that her husband was in danger. She was further afraid of what she might discover if she returned home. Mastrati called Edward, who agreed to meet with the police. Officers Mastrati, Smith, Russell, and Sergeant Barth met with him outside the Caniglia household. Kim was waiting nearby in her car. Barth observed Caniglia as appearing "agitated" and "angry" while Mastrati and Russell noted "calm," "cooperative," and "normal" behavior. Kim also remarked that Edward was upset that police were called. Sergeant Barth ultimately concluded that Edward posed a danger to himself and others. He then agreed with Barth's request to receive a psychiatric evaluation at a nearby hospital. According to Edward, he complied with the request only because the officers promised they would not confiscate his weapons if he sought treatment. On that same morning, one of the Caniglias informed police that another firearm was present in the home. Barth asked his superiors to confiscate the firearms, with Captain Henry approving the proposal. Kim directed the officers to the locations of the weapons, along with the magazines and associated ammunition. Police knew that Edward owned the items and did not want them seized. After multiple attempts to retrieve the firearms back from the police department, his lawyer requested in October 2015 that the guns be returned to Edward. Two months later, the firearms were returned. Shortly before getting the guns back, Edward sued the City of Cranston and the police department for violating his 4th Amendment rights.

=== District Court and Court of Appeals ===
In its decision, the United States District Court for the District of Rhode Island analyzed Edward Caniglia's case on ten factors (Fourth Amendment law, the community caretaking exception, qualified immunity, the Second Amendment of the United States Constitution, Article I, § 22 of the Constitution of Rhode Island, Fourteenth Amendment Due Process, Fourteenth Amendment Equal Protection, the Rhode Island Firearms Act, the Rhode Island Mental Health Law, and Caniglia's claim of conversion). Issuing a summary judgement, the district court ruled that Caniglia 's due process rights were infringed because the police failed to return his property or instruct him on retrieving his firearms after he was deemed safe. However, the court denied his other claims of conversion, violation of the RIMHL, and violation of 4th Amendment rights. Additionally, the district court judges decided that the officers acted reasonably based on the reports from Kim Caniglia. Rebutting Edward Caniglia's claim that the community caretaking exception only applies to vehicles, qualified immunity was granted to the officers because case law and judicial attitudes towards community caretaking involving the home were ambiguous at best and poorly defined at worst. Furthermore, Caniglia's right to bear arms was not violated because police reasonably asserted he was suicidal and his guns were eventually returned; his Equal Protection claim also faltered because merely speculated about the fate of gun owners in Cranston rather than pointing out the treatment of a specific individual. Claims for compensation were denied under the RIFA because the police returned the guns to Caniglia without a court order. Caniglia was neither stopped nor arrested for law enforcement purposes; he was only detained as part of community caretaking duties. Finally, the police department did not violate the RIMHL because there was no evidence of a conspiracy to admit Caniglia, and that he was briefly evaluated and released without law enforcement encouraging staff to have him stay.

The United States Court of Appeals for the First Circuit affirmed the district court's decision by declaring, "Police officers play an important role as community caretakers.... Here, the actions of the defendant officers, though not letter perfect, did not exceed the proper province of their community caretaking responsibilities."

== Supreme Court ==
Certiorari was granted in the case on November 20, 2020. The case was argued on March 24, 2021, and decided on May 17, 2021. In a unanimous decision (9-0), Justice Clarence Thomas delivered the majority opinion. In Caniglia's case, the community caretaking exception was used far beyond the bounds of the 4th Amendment:

The First Circuit's "community caretaking" rule, however, goes beyond anything this Court has recognized. The decision below assumed that respondents lacked a warrant or consent, and it expressly disclaimed the possibility that they were reacting to a crime. The court also declined to consider whether any recognized exigent circumstances were present because respondents had forfeited the point. Nor did it find that respondents' actions were akin to what a private citizen might have had authority to do if petitioner's wife had approached a neighbor for assistance instead of the police.

Neither the holding nor logic of Cady justified that approach. True, Cady also involved a warrantless search for a firearm. But the location of that search was an impounded vehicle—not a home—" 'a constitutional difference' " that the opinion repeatedly stressed. 413 U. S., at 439; see also id., at 440–442. In fact, Cady expressly contrasted its treatment of a vehicle already under police control with a search of a car "parked adjacent to the dwelling place of the owner." Id., at 446–448 (citing Coolidge v. New Hampshire, 403 U.S. 443 (1971)).

Cady's unmistakable distinction between vehicles and homes also places into proper context its reference to "community caretaking." This quote comes from a portion of the opinion explaining that the "frequency with which . . . vehicle[s] can become disabled or involved in . . . accident[s] on public highways" often requires police to perform noncriminal "community caretaking functions," such as providing aid to motorists. 413 U. S., at 441. But, this recognition that police officers perform many civic tasks in modern society was just that—a recognition that these tasks exist, and not an open-ended license to perform them anywhere.

=== Chief Justice Roberts' concurrence ===
Chief Justice John Roberts (joined by Justice Stephen Breyer) declares that the court unanimously recognized in Brigham City v. Stuart that the role of the police is to prevent violence and restore order rather than merely rendering aid to casualties. A warrant is not required when there is a need to assist those who are seriously injured or threatened with such injury. Although warrantless entry is justified if there is an objectively reasonable basis that a party was in need of medical assistance or in serious danger, the facts described in the opinion do not contradict case law. Therefore, Roberts fully agrees with the majority.

=== Justice Alito's concurrence ===
While Justice Samuel Alito agreed that there is no broad 4th Amendment rule for community caretaking, he opines that specific scenarios such as conducting a search and seizure on a suicidal person, red flag laws, and warrantless searches to check on a resident's medical condition were not properly addressed. He further writes:

One additional category of cases should be noted: those involving warrantless, nonconsensual searches of a home for the purpose of ascertaining whether a resident is in urgent need of medical attention and cannot summon help. At oral argument, The Chief Justice posed a question that highlighted this problem. He imagined a situation in which neighbors of an elderly woman call the police and express concern because the woman had agreed to come over for dinner at 6 p.m., but by 8 p.m., had not appeared or called even though she was never late for anything. The woman had not been seen leaving her home, and she was not answering the phone. Nor could the neighbors reach her relatives by phone. If the police entered the home without a warrant to see if she needed help, would that violate the Fourth Amendment? Tr. of Oral Arg. 6–8.

Petitioner's answer was that it would. Indeed, he argued, even if 24 hours went by, the police still could not lawfully enter without a warrant. If the situation remained unchanged for several days, he suggested, the police might be able to enter after obtaining "a warrant for a missing person." Id., at 9.

The Chief Justice's question concerns an important real-world problem. Today, more than ever, many people, including many elderly persons, live alone.[3] Many elderly men and women fall in their homes,[4] or become incapacitated for other reasons, and unfortunately, there are many cases in which such persons cannot call for assistance. In those cases, the chances for a good recovery may fade with each passing hour.[5] So in The Chief Justice's imaginary case, if the elderly woman was seriously hurt or sick and the police heeded petitioner's suggestion about what the Fourth Amendment demands, there is a fair chance she would not be found alive. This imaginary woman may have regarded her house as her castle, but it is doubtful that she would have wanted it to be the place where she died alone and in agony.
Our current precedents do not address situations like this. We have held that the police may enter a home without a warrant when there are "exigent circumstances." Payton v. New York, 445 U.S. 573, 590 (1980). But circumstances are exigent only when there is not enough time to get a warrant, see Missouri v. McNeely, 569 U.S. 141, 149 (2013); Michigan v. Tyler, 436 U.S. 499, 509 (1978), and warrants are not typically granted for the purpose of checking on a person's medical condition. Perhaps States should institute procedures for the issuance of such warrants, but in the meantime, courts may be required to grapple with the basic Fourth Amendment question of reasonableness.
The three categories of cases discussed above are simply illustrative. Searches and seizures conducted for other non-law-enforcement purposes may arise and may present their own Fourth Amendment issues. Today's decision does not settle those questions.

In sum, the Court properly rejects the broad "community caretaking" theory on which the decision below was based. The Court's decision goes no further, and on that understanding, I join the opinion in full.

=== Justice Kavanaugh's concurrence ===
Justice Brett Kavanaugh concurred that although he agrees with the Court fully, he argues that the decision clarifies labeling more than ramifications. While the community caretaking doctrine applies to primarily vehicles, the exigent circumstances doctrine could very well apply to Caniglia.

This case does not require us to explore all the contours of the exigent circumstances doctrine as applied to emergency-aid situations because the officers here disclaimed reliance on that doctrine. But to avoid any confusion going forward, I think it important to briefly describe how the doctrine applies to some heartland emergency-aid situations....
Suppose that a woman calls a healthcare hotline or 911 and says that she is contemplating suicide, that she has firearms in her home, and that she might as well die. The operator alerts the police, and two officers respond by driving to the woman's home. They knock on the door but do not receive a response. May the officers enter the home? Of course.
Consider another example. Suppose that an elderly man is uncharacteristically absent from Sunday church services and repeatedly fails to answer his phone throughout the day and night. A concerned relative calls the police and asks the officers to perform a wellness check. Two officers drive to the man's home. They knock but receive no response. May the officers enter the home? Of course.
To be sure, courts, police departments, and police officers alike must take care that officers' actions in those kinds of cases are reasonable under the circumstances. But both of those examples and others as well, such as cases involving unattended young children inside a home, illustrate the kinds of warrantless entries that are perfectly constitutional under the exigent circumstances doctrine, in my view.
