= James J. Kilpatrick =

American journalist, writer (1920–2010)

- Born: James Jackson Kilpatrick; November 1, 1920; Oklahoma City, Oklahoma, U.S.
- Died: August 15, 2010 (aged 89); Washington, D.C., U.S.
- Education: University of Missouri (BJ)
- Occupations: Journalist, columnist, author, writer, grammarian
- Spouses: Marie Louise Pietri (m. 1942; died 1997) Marianne Means (m. 1998)
- Children: 3

James Jackson Kilpatrick (November 1, 1920 – August 15, 2010) was an American newspaper journalist, columnist, author, writer and grammarian. During the 1950s and early 1960s he was editor of The Richmond News Leader in Richmond, Virginia and encouraged the Massive Resistance strategy to oppose the U.S. Supreme Court's decisions in the Brown v. Board of Education ruling which outlawed racial segregation in public schools. For three decades beginning in the mid-1960s, Kilpatrick wrote a nationally syndicated column "A Conservative View", and sparred for years with liberals Nicholas von Hoffman and later Shana Alexander on the television news program 60 Minutes.

== Early and family life ==
Kilpatrick was born on November 1, 1920, in Oklahoma City, Oklahoma. His father lost the family lumber business during the Great Depression, which led to his parents' divorce. Kilpatrick earned a degree in journalism from the University of Missouri in 1941. He married sculptor Marie Louise Pietri in 1942. She died in 1997. They had three sons, M. Sean Kilpatrick, Christopher, and Kevin Kilpatrick. In 1998, Kilpatrick married liberal Washington-based syndicated columnist Marianne Means.

== Career and segregationism ==
Upon graduation, Kilpatrick moved to Richmond, Virginia, and began working for Douglas Southall Freeman, Pulitzer-prize winning author of biographies of General Robert E. Lee and editor of The Richmond News Leader. In 1950, Kilpatrick succeeded Freeman as the daily newspaper's editor. Kilpatrick championed the case of Silas Rogers, a young black shoeshine man wrongfully convicted of killing a police officer, and ultimately pardoned as a result of Kilpatrick's research; Kilpatrick received a courage and justice award from a black newspaper in 1953 for his reporting in that case.

However, the following year, Kilpatrick aligned himself with the Byrd Organization and became one of the leading advocates of continued racial segregation during the Civil Rights Movement. Kilpatrick opposed federal involvement into state-enforced racial segregation, and later opposed enforcement of civil rights legislation. After the 1954 and 1955 Supreme Court decisions in Brown v. Board of Education and related cases, Kilpatrick devised "states' rights" and other rationales which helped convince Virginia's U.S. Senator, Harry Byrd, to advocate the massive resistance strategy in Virginia and claim leadership of the anti-integration movement throughout the South. In particular, Kilpatrick reformulated the states' rights doctrine of interposition, arguing that individual states had the right to oppose and even nullify federal court rulings. In November 1960, Kilpatrick participated in a television debate about segregation with Martin Luther King Jr. in New York.

Kilpatrick was appointed vice-chairman of the Virginia Commission on Constitutional Government led by attorney David J. Mays. In 1963, Kilpatrick published an analysis of the post-Civil War Civil Rights Cases and two pamphlets: "Civil Rights and Legal Wrongs," attacking the Civil Rights Act proposed by President John F. Kennedy, and "Civil Rights and Federal Wrongs," attacking expansion of the Equal Employment Opportunity Commission. His arguments for segregation were not entirely based on federalism. In 1963, Kilpatrick submitted an article to The Saturday Evening Post, "The Hell He Is Equal" in which he wrote that the "Negro race, as a race, is in fact an inferior race." (The magazine's editors rejected the article after the 16th Street Baptist Church bombing killed four black schoolgirls.) Kilpatrick eventually changed his position on segregation, though he remained a staunch opponent of federal encroachments on the states.

Kilpatrick told a Roanoke newspaper in 1993 that he had intended merely to delay court-mandated integration because "violence was right under the city waiting to break loose. Probably, looking back, I should have had better consciousness of the immorality, the absolute evil of segregation."

As editor of The Richmond News Leader, Kilpatrick also began the Beadle Bumble fund to pay fines for victims of what he termed "despots on the bench." He built the fund with contributions from readers and later used the Beadle Bumble Fund to defend books as well as people. After a school board in suburban Richmond ordered school libraries to dispose of all copies of Harper Lee's To Kill a Mockingbird, because the board found the book immoral, Kilpatrick wrote, "A more moral novel scarcely could be imagined." With money from the fund, Kilpatrick offered free copies to children who wrote him; by the end of the first week, he had given away 81 copies.

== Columnist and author ==
Kilpatrick began writing his syndicated political column, "A Conservative View", in 1964 and left the News Leader in 1966. In 1979, he joined the Universal Press Syndicate as a columnist, eventually distributed to more than 180 newspapers around the country. Kilpatrick lived in Rappahannock County, Virginia and made the dateline of his columns, "Scrabble, Virginia" as more engaging than his actual postal address in Woodville, Virginia. Kilpatrick entered semi-retirement in 1993, shifting from a three-times-a-week political column to a weekly column on judicial issues, "Covering the Courts", which ended in 2008.

For many years, he published a syndicated column dealing with English usage, especially in writing, called "The Writer's Art" (also the title of his 1985 book on writing). In January 2009, the Universal Syndicate announced that Kilpatrick would end this column owing to health reasons. His other books include The Foxes Union, a recollection of his life in Rappahannock County, Virginia, in the Blue Ridge Mountains; Fine Print: Reflections on the Writing Art; and, A Political Bestiary, which he co-wrote with former U.S. Senator Eugene McCarthy and Pulitzer Prize-winning editorial cartoonist Jeff MacNelly.

== Television ==
Kilpatrick became best known for his nine years as a participant on the TV news magazine 60 Minutes. In the 1970s, he appeared in a closing segment called "Point-Counterpoint", opposite Nicholas von Hoffman and, later, Shana Alexander. "If ever I heard an oversimplified fairy tale of the last years in Vietnam, I just heard one from you," Kilpatrick said in one exchange. They peppered their remarks with 'Oh, come on, Jack' and 'Now see here, Shana' and helped make possible even-more combative talk shows, including Crossfire.

The debates between Kilpatrick and Alexander were such a feature of contemporary American culture that they were satirized on Saturday Night Live, with Dan Aykroyd's version of Kilpatrick ("Jane, you ignorant slut!") taking on Jane Curtin ("Dan, you pompous ass!") on "Weekend Update". The comedy film Airplane! also parodies "Point-Counterpoint", as the Kilpatrick stand-in (played by William Tregoe) shows a lack of concern for the passengers on the stricken airliner: "Shana, they bought their tickets. They knew what they were getting into. I say, let 'em crash!"

== Death ==
Kilpatrick died in 2010 at George Washington University Hospital in Washington, D.C., aged 89. He was survived by his second wife, three sons, four stepchildren, and many grandchildren. His personal papers, including his editorial files and correspondence, are housed in Special Collections of the University of Virginia Library. Guides and descriptions of Kilpatrick's papers are available through the Virginia Heritage database.

== Works ==
- The Sovereign States: Notes of a Citizen of Virginia. Chicago: Henry Regnery Company, 1957.
- The Smut Peddlers: The Pornography Racket and the Law Dealing with Obscenity Censorship. Doubleday, 1960.
- The Southern Case for School Segregation. Crowell-Collier Press, 1962.
- The Foxes' Union, EPM Publications, Inc., 1977.
- A Political Bestiary, Viable Alternatives, Impressive Mandates & Other Fables (with Eugene McCarthy and Jeff MacNelly), 1978.
- The American South: Four Seasons of the Land (with William A. Bake). Oxmoor House, 1983.
- The Writer's Art. Andrews McMeel Publishing, 1985. ISBN 0-8362-7925-5
- The Ear Is Human: A Handbook of Homophones and Other Confusions. Andrews McMeel Publishing, 1985. ISBN 0-8362-1259-2
- Fine Print: Reflections on the Writing Art. Andrews McMeel Publishing, 1993.
