= Flagg Bros. =

Flagg Bros. may refer to:

- Genesco, owner of Flagg Bros. shoes stores
- Flagg Bros., Inc. v. Brooks, a case decided by the Supreme Court of the United States
