= Ohralik v. Ohio State Bar Ass'n =

- Supreme Court of the United States

Argued January 16, 1978 Decided May 30, 1978
- Full case name: Ohralik v. Ohio State Bar Association
- Docket no.: 76-1650
- Citations: 436 U.S. 447 (more) 98 S. Ct. 1912, 56 L. Ed. 2d 444, 1978 U.S. LEXIS 29
- Argument: Oral argument

Holding
- Professional ethics rules for the legal profession that ban in-person solicitation of clients do not violate the right to free speech as guaranteed by the First and Fourteenth Amendments.

Court membership
- Chief Justice Warren E. Burger Associate Justices William J. Brennan Jr. · Potter Stewart; Byron White · Thurgood Marshall; Harry Blackmun · Lewis F. Powell Jr. William Rehnquist · John P. Stevens

Case opinions
- Majority: Powell, joined by Stewart, White, Burger, Blackmun, Stevens
- Concurrence: Marshall
- Concurrence: Rehnquist
- Brennan took no part in the consideration or decision of the case.

Laws applied
- U.S Const. amend. I

Ohralik v. Ohio State Bar Association, 436 US 447 (1978), was a decision by the Supreme Court of the United States that in-person solicitation of clients by lawyers was not protected speech under the First Amendment of the U.S. Constitution.

== Background ==
=== Factual background ===
In February 1974, two 18-year-olds, Carol McClintock and Wanda Lou Holbert, were badly injured in a car accident in their hometown of Montville, Ohio. When Albert Ohralik, a local attorney, learned of the accident, he sought to speak with each of them in person to offer his services. He first called Carol McClinktock's parents, who told him that she was in the hospital; when he said he might visit her, the parents said he should stop by their house to talk to them first. He did so, learning from them that the motorist who struck Carol's vehicle was uninsured, and after discussing their insurance policy and applicable laws, he brought up the possibility of hiring a lawyer. The parents stated that Carol was 18, and it would be her decision; then Ohralik went to visit Carol in the hospital. Carol did not object to hiring Ohralik, although she did not sign the agreement until talking about it with her parents.

Ohralik also tried to visit Wanda Lou Holbert in the hospital, but she was released before he did. He learned her address from the McClintocks and visited her at home, uninvited. He secretly recorded the conversation and briefly interviewed her about the accident, and then got her oral agreement to be legally represented by him. Both McClintock and Holbert agreed to pay Ohralik one-third of any recovery as his fee.

However, both soon discharged Ohralik. Holbert decided she did not want to sue, and McClintock chose to hire another attorney. In a breach of contract claim, Ohralik forced McClintock to pay him one-third of her recovery.

=== Disciplinary proceedings ===
Both McClintock and Holbert filed ethics complaints with the Geauga County Bar Association, which referred the case to the Ohio State Bar Association. The Bar Association filed a formal complaint with the Board of Commissioners on Grievances and Discipline of the Supreme Court of Ohio. After a hearing, the Board found that Ohralik had violated the Ohio Code of Professional Responsibility. Ohralik argued that soliciting clients in person was speech, and therefore was protected by the First Amendment (as incorporated against the States by the Fourteenth Amendment). The Board rejected this argument, and recommended a public reprimand. The Supreme Court of Ohio accepted the Board's reasoning, but increased the sanction to indefinite suspension. Ohralik appealed to the U.S. Supreme Court.

== Case before the Supreme Court ==
=== Arguments ===
Arguing for the suspension to be overturned, Ohralik asserted that his situation was essentially identical to another Supreme Court case from the prior year, Bates v. State Bar of Arizona. In Bates, the Court had ruled that attorneys have a right to advertise their services, deeming it an instance of commercial speech which deserves protection under the First Amendment. Ohralik said that he had explained to McClintock and Holbert their legal rights in the situation, and made himself available to pursue their claims. Moreover, neither the Ohio State Bar Association nor the Supreme Court of Ohio had established any "specific harm that the State has a compelling interest in preventing".

Arguing to uphold the suspension, the Ohio State Bar Association said that in-person solicitation of clients was particularly problematic for the legal profession, and a blanket ban was justified, even under the First Amendment. An in-person conversation creates pressure to say yes or no immediately, without time to consider alternatives. This problem is made worse in situations of stress (say, the scene of an accident or crime) or vulnerability (such as a hospital room).

=== Decision ===
In an 8–0 vote (Justice Brennan not participating), the Court agreed with the Ohio State Bar Association. Powell wrote for a six-justice majority, and Marshall and Rehnquist each wrote concurring opinions. Constitutional protection for commercial speech was a relatively new doctrine, with three major cases having been decided in the previous five years, including Pittsburgh Press Co. v. Pittsburgh Commission on Human Relations, 413 U.S. 376 (1973); Bigelow v. Virginia, 421 U.S. 809 (1975); Virginia State Pharmacy Board v. Virginia Citizens Consumer Council, 425 U.S. 748 (1976). The Court held that in-person solicitation by lawyers was distinct from other kinds of commercial speech, as far as the First Amendment was concerned. The potential problems with in-person solicitation were not to be taken lightly:

The aim and effect of in-person solicitation may be to provide a one-sided presentation and to encourage speedy and perhaps uninformed decisionmaking; there is no opportunity for intervention or counter-education by agencies of the Bar, supervisory authorities, or persons close to the solicited individual. The admonition that "the fitting remedy for evil counsels is good ones" is of little value when the circumstances provide no opportunity for any remedy at all.

— Ohralik v. Ohio State Bar Ass'n, 436 US 447 at 457 (1978) (Powell, writing for the majority)

Second, states continued to have a "particularly strong" interest in regulating the practice of law. Although the rule against in-person solicitation apparently originated as rule of etiquette, rather than ethics, the dangers at hand justified a prophylactic rule. Accordingly, the Ohio State Bar Association was not obligated to examine the particular circumstances and establish "specific harms".

Still, Powell did note that Ohralik's conduct in this case did him no favors. The fact that he approached and solicited young adults with only high school degrees in vulnerable situations ("Both were in pain and may have been on medication") and his stubbornness after being fired were a "striking example" of why in-person solicitation by lawyers was a bad idea.

=== Concurrences ===
Justice Marshall concurred in the judgment, as he agreed that Ohralik's behavior warranted the discipline he received. However, Marshall argued that states should have to consider the particular circumstances of instances of in-person solicitation. Agreeing in broad terms that there were dangers lurking when lawyers tried to drum up business in-person, he nevertheless argued,

. . .these concededly legitimate interests might well be served by more specific and less restrictive rules than a total ban on pecuniary solicitation. For example, the Justice Department has suggested that the disciplinary rules be reworded "so as to permit all solicitation and advertising except the kinds that are false, misleading, undignified, or champertous."

— Ohralik v. Ohio State Bar Ass'n, 436 US 447 at 476 (1978) (Marshall, concurring in the judgment, emphasis in original)

Justice Rehnquist, on the other hand, believed that states should have even more leeway to regulate lawyers than the majority allowed. His one-sentence concurrence simply referred to his dissent in In Re Primus, 436 U.S. 412 (1978), decided the same day.

== See also ==
- Ambulance chasing
- In Re Primus
