= Marianne Means =

American political columnist (1934–2017)

- Means in 1983
- Born: Marianne Hansen; June 13, 1934; Sioux City, Iowa, U.S.
- Died: December 2, 2017 (aged 83); Washington, D.C., U.S.
- Education: University of Nebraska; George Washington University
- Occupations: Journalist; columnist
- Spouses: C. Paul Means (m. 1956; div. 1961); Emmet Riordan (m. 1965; div. 1969); Edward H. DeHart (c. 1970s); Warren Weaver Jr (m. 1976; died 1997); James J. Kilpatrick (m. 1998; died 2010)

Marianne Means (née Hansen; June 13, 1934 – December 2, 2017) was an American journalist and syndicated political columnist based in Washington, D.C. who, for many years, was a White House correspondent. She started her career as a reporter and advanced to the role of a copy editor for a newspaper in Nebraska for a couple of years. She then relocated to Washington, D.C. where she took a position as the chief editor for a Virginia newspaper and supervised a staff of men for two years.

She later transferred to Hearst Newspapers where she was a Washington bureau correspondent. She covered the reporting of John F. Kennedy's presidential campaign. Then she reported full-time at the White House and was the first female reporter to do this. There were rumors she was one of Kennedy's many lovers. She covered Kennedy's assassination and the transition to the administration of Lyndon B. Johnson. As a political reporter for The New York Times she reported on every presidential campaign from Kennedy to Bill Clinton. She was an international commentator and television personality.

== Early life and education ==
Marianne Means was born in Sioux City, Iowa, on June 13, 1934. She was the daughter of Ernest Maynard Hansen and Else Marie Johanne (Andersen) Hansen. Her mother was from Copenhagen, Denmark, and immigrated with the family to Sioux City when a baby. She was valedictorian from her 1922 high school and worked as a secretary for the superintendent of the local schools. She died at 92 in 1996. Means' father was president of Ingwersen Brothers Livestock Commission Company, a large livestock business in Iowa. He died in 1973.

Means attended public schools in Sioux City, where she grew up. In 1956, Means graduated from the University of Nebraska, receiving a Bachelor of Arts degree. She received a Juris Doctor degree from George Washington University Law School in Washington, D.C. in 1977.

== Career ==
In 1956, Means started her career working as a reporter for the Dakota County Star; she used the pen names "Marianne Hansen Means" and "Marianne Means". She next worked as a copy editor and wire editor for the Lincoln Journal in Lincoln, Nebraska, from 1955 to 1957. She then moved to the Washington, D.C., area in 1957, and took a new position as the Woman's editor for the Northern Virginia Sun in Arlington, Virginia, where she supervised a staff of 15 men for two years.

Means moved to Hearst Newspapers in 1959, and became the group's Washington bureau correspondent, covering Capitol Hill and politics. The next year, she was assigned to presidential conventions and John F. Kennedy's presidential campaign. Her journalism career was advanced when she escorted Kennedy and wrote about him and his speechwriter Theodore C. Sorensen visiting the University of Nebraska. After Kennedy was elected president, he suggested Means be assigned to cover the White House full-time. She was featured on the January 22, 1961, episode of the popular TV show What's My Line?

Secret Service agents and members of the press knew Means was one of President Kennedy's many lovers. She worked as White House correspondent from 1961 through 1965. She was the first female reporter to be assigned to cover all of the White House activity full-time.

Means reported on Kennedy's trips to Latin America and Europe, the summit conference with Soviet Premier Nikita Khrushchev, the Cuban Missile Crisis, and national crises. She was a political columnist for Hearst Newspapers and King Features Syndicate from 1965 to 1994, when she became a political reporter for The New York Times. Means reported on all the presidential campaigns from Kennedy to Bill Clinton. She was also a commentator for CBS Radio, Mutual Broadcasting System, Voice of America, Post Newsweek Stations, and National Public Radio.

Means covered the assassination of John F. Kennedy and the transition to the Johnson administration. in 1974, she reported President Lyndon B. Johnson told her in confidence Lee Harvey Oswald had acted alone but was motivated by the ideals of Fidel Castro. She appeared on the television programs Today, Meet the Press, and The Tonight Show, which was hosted by Johnny Carson.

== Awards ==
In 1962, Means won the New York Newspaper Women's Club Front Page Award for the best feature writing.

== Societies ==
Means was associated with the National Press Foundation, the International Women's Media Foundation, the White House Correspondents' Association, the National Press Club, Cosmos Club, Gridiron Club (president), Delta Delta Delta, Sigma Delta Chi, and Phi Beta Kappa. She was given a lifetime recognition award at the Sigma Delta Chi sorority.

== Private life ==
Means was married five times. Her first marriage, in 1956, was to C. Paul Means; they divorced in 1961. In 1965, she wed Emmet Riordan (1920–2006), an official in the Executive Office of the President; they were divorced in 1969. She was briefly married to government affairs consultant Edward H. DeHart in the early 1970s. In 1976, she married The New York Times reporter Warren Weaver Jr (died February 1997). In June 1998, she married James J. Kilpatrick (1920–2010), who died in 2010. Means died at the age of 83 on December 2, 2017.

== Published works ==
Means' book The Woman in the White House, which is about the lives of 12 first ladies, including Bess Truman, Mamie Eisenhower, and Jacqueline Kennedy Onassis, was published by Random House Publishing in 1963.

== Sources ==
- Commire, Anne (2007). Dictionary of Women Worldwide: M-Z. Thomson Gale. ISBN 978-0-7876-7677-3.
- Editor & Publisher. Lutz, Florida: Curated Experiences Group. 1965. ISSN 0013-094X. OCLC 12353242.
- Marquis Who's who 1971–1972. Marquis Who's Who, Inc. 1971. ISBN 978-0-8379-0812-0.
- O'Neill, Lois Decker (February 1, 1979). World records and achievements. Doubleday. ISBN 978-0-385-12732-5.
- Read, Phyllis J. (1992). The Book of Women's Firsts. Random House. ISBN 978-0-679-40975-5. "(1961–65)."
- Riley, Sam G. (1995). American Newspaper Columnists. Greenwood Publishing Group. ISBN 978-0-313-29192-0.
- Taft, William H. (July 16, 2015). Twentieth Century Journalists. Taylor & Francis. ISBN 978-1-317-40324-1.
