= List of United States Supreme Court cases, volume 436 =

This is a list of all the United States Supreme Court cases from volume 436 of the United States Reports:

Case name	Citation	Date decided
Memphis Light, Gas & Water Div. v. Craft	436 U.S. 1	1978
United States v. Jacobs	436 U.S. 31	1978
United States v. California	436 U.S. 32	1978
Santa Clara Pueblo v. Martinez	436 U.S. 49	1978
Kulko v. Super. Ct.	436 U.S. 84	1978
SEC v. Sloan	436 U.S. 103	1978
Scott v. United States	436 U.S. 128	1978
Flagg Bros., Inc. v. Brooks	436 U.S. 149	1978
Sears, Roebuck & Co. v. Carpenters	436 U.S. 180	1978
Slodov v. United States	436 U.S. 238	1978
Withholding payroll taxes accrued before sale of a business is the personal responsibility of the seller.
United States v. Sotelo	436 U.S. 268	1978
Pinkus v. United States	436 U.S. 293	1978
Marshall v. Barlow's, Inc.	436 U.S. 307	1978
United States v. Mauro	436 U.S. 340	1978
Baldwin v. Fish & Game Comm'n	436 U.S. 371	1978
Vitek v. Jones	436 U.S. 407	1978
In re Primus	436 U.S. 412	1978
Ohralik v. Ohio State Bar Ass'n	436 U.S. 447	1978
Taylor v. Kentucky	436 U.S. 478	1978
Gen. Atomic Co. v. Felter	436 U.S. 493	1978
Michigan v. Tyler	436 U.S. 499	1978
California v. Southland Royalty Co.	436 U.S. 519	1978
Zurcher v. Stanford Daily	436 U.S. 547	1978
Robertson v. Wegmann	436 U.S. 584	1978
Andrus v. Charlestone Stone Prods. Co.	436 U.S. 604	1978
Mobil Oil Corp. v. Higginbotham	436 U.S. 618	1978
Trans Alaska Pipeline Rate Cases	436 U.S. 631	1978
Monell v. Department of Social Services of the City of New York	436 U.S. 658	1978
Quern v. Mandley	436 U.S. 725	1978
Agosto v. INS	436 U.S. 748	1978
FCC v. Nat'l Citizens Comm.	436 U.S. 775	1978
Nat'l Boiler Mktg. Ass'n v. United States	436 U.S. 816	1978
Terk v. Gordon	436 U.S. 850	1978
Little v. Ciuros	436 U.S. 1301	1978
