= Ramona Ripston =

American activist (1927–2018)

Executive director of the American Civil Liberties Union of Southern California
- In office 1972–2011
- Succeeded by: Hector O. Villagra

Personal details
- Born: February 18, 1927 Queens, New York, U.S.
- Died: November 3, 2018 (aged 91) Los Angeles, California, U.S.

Ramona Ann Ripston (February 18, 1927 – November 3, 2018) served as the executive director of the American Civil Liberties Union of Southern California (ACLU SoCal) between 1972 and 2011. In her 38 years at the helm of the ACLU SoCal, Ripston helped bring about substantial reforms in the region.

== Early life ==
Ripston was born on February 18, 1927, in Queens, New York. Her parents were William and Elsie (née Fleischman). In 1948, she graduated from Hunter College with a degree in political science.

== Career ==
Ripston worked for the New York Civil Liberties Union as its public relations director then moved to the Emergency Civil Liberties Committee in 1965.

In 1972 Ripston became director of the American Civil Liberties Union of Southern California. She became "the first woman — and one of the few non-lawyers — to head an A.C.L.U. affiliate."

At the beginning of her tenure, the ACLU SoCal had six employees and an all-male board of directors. Ripston began to grow the organization and diversify the board; she appointed more women, people of color and members of the LGBT community. By the time she retired from her position in 2011, the ACLU SoCal had 50 employees in two offices.

== Personal life ==
Ripston was married five times. She was the widow of federal judge Stephen Reinhardt at the time of her death in Marina del Rey, California, on November 3, 2018.
