= CIC Services, LLC v. Internal Revenue Service =

- Supreme Court of the United States

Argued Dec 1, 2020 Decided May 17, 2021
- Full case name: CIC Services, LLC v. Internal Revenue Service
- Docket no.: 19-930
- Citations: 593 U.S. 209 (more) 141 S.Ct. 1582; 209 L.Ed. 2d 615

Case history
- Prior: CIC Servs., LLC v. IRS, 925 F.3d 247 (6th Cir. 2019), aff'g CIC Servs., LLC v. IRS, No. 3:17-cv-110, 2017 WL 5015510 (E.D. Tenn., Nov. 2, 2017), reh'g en banc denied 936 F.3d 501, cert. granted 590 U.S. 929.

Holding
- A suit to enjoin IRS Notice 2016–66 did not trigger the Anti-Injunction Act even though a violation of the notice may have resulted in a tax penalty.

Court membership
- Chief Justice John Roberts Associate Justices Clarence Thomas · Stephen Breyer; Samuel Alito · Sonia Sotomayor; Elena Kagan · Neil Gorsuch; Brett Kavanaugh · Amy Coney Barrett

Case opinions
- Majority: Kagan, joined by unanimous
- Concurrence: Sotomayor; Kavanaugh

Laws applied
- Anti-Injunction Act

CIC Services, LLC v. Internal Revenue Service, 593 U.S. 209 (2021), was a United States Supreme Court case in which the Court held that a suit to enjoin IRS Notice 2016–66 did not trigger the Anti-Injunction Act even though a violation of the notice may have resulted in a tax penalty.
