= Alfred Avins =

American lawyer

Alfred Avins (1934–1999) was an American lawyer, law professor, and dean.

== Biography ==
Born in New York City on June 29, 1934, Avins earned his undergraduate bachelor's degree from City University of New York, 1954, an LL.B. from Columbia Law School, 1956, his J.D. from the University of Chicago and a Ph.D. from the University of Cambridge. His first book was The Law of AWOL (1957). He was best known as a staunch opponent of Civil Rights legislation; he was the author of numerous articles that criticized anti-discrimination legislation or sought to limit its scope. Avins was the author of The Reconstruction Amendments' Debates: The Legislative History and Contemporary Debates in Congress on the 13th, 14th, and 15th Amendments (Virginia Commission on Constitutional Government, 1967), which was designed to show the limited scope of the Reconstruction Amendments to support federal anti-discrimination legislation. It has proven a useful resource for some scholars looking into the history of the Reconstruction Amendments.

Avins also argued in the late 1960s that the drafters of the 14th Amendment did not intend to nullify anti-miscegenation laws or to prohibit school segregation, and that landmark cases such as Brown v. Board of Education and Loving v. Virginia were therefore wrongly decided and "stand[] on clay feet." Avins argued vociferously that the Congressional proponents of the 14th Amendment would not sub silentio have enacted such a sweeping and transformational social change as the abolition of school segregation without ever mentioning or debating this topic during the Amendment's ratification process.

In the 1970s, Avins was a co-founder of the Delaware Law School. From the mid-1970s into the 1980s, he repeatedly and unsuccessfully sued Delaware Law School over his dismissal as a professor and other issues. In 1977, he founded the former District of Columbia Law School, which he moved to Alexandria in 1980, changing its name to Northern Virginia Law School. Issues of accreditation with this school also resulted in unsuccessful litigation in federal court.

Alfred Avins died on May 24, 1999, in Bethesda, Maryland.
