= Virginia Commission on Constitutional Government =

The Virginia Commission on Constitutional Government was a state agency created by the Virginia legislature in 1956, with the mission of promoting "constitutional government" in the wake of Brown v. Board of Education. The fifteen-member Commission brought together leading Virginia writers, journalists, lawyers, and politicians, with the governor serving as an ex officio member. The Commission was charged to "develop and promulgate information concerning the dual system of government, federal and state, established under the Constitution of the United States and those of the several states." The group was also directed "to acquaint the general public...with the nature of the relationship between the individual states and the United States and the freedoms reserved to the states and their individual citizens." To this end, the Commission, headed by David J. Mays, a Pulitzer Prize–winning author, and James J. Kilpatrick, authored numerous pamphlets and books opposing integration of the public schools, federal civil rights statutes, and recent Supreme Court decisions. The Commission maintained an active publication schedule until 1967.

Beginning in 1959, the VCCG began working with the Virginia department of education to develop a two-semester course for high school seniors on American government and political institutions. In 1964 a hardcover book, We the States: An Anthology of Historic Documents and Commentaries thereon, Expounding the State and Federal Relationship, was distributed to school libraries in Virginia. The Commission also provided each high school senior with an annotated copy of the United States Constitution.

Their publications included Civil Rights and Federal Powers, Civil Rights and Legal Wrongs, The Right Not to Listen, Did the Court Interpret or Amend?, and Alfred Avins' The Reconstruction amendments' debates : the legislative history and contemporary debates in Congress on the 13th, 14th, and 15th amendments.
