= Sanchez v. Mayorkas =

- Supreme Court of the United States

Argued April 19, 2021 Decided June 7, 2021
- Full case name: Jose Santos Sanchez et ux. v. Alejandro Mayorkas, Secretary of Homeland Security, et al.
- Docket no.: 20-315
- Citations: 593 U.S. ___ (more) 141 S. Ct. 1809; 210 L. Ed. 2d 52

Case history
- Prior: Sanchez v. Johnson, No. 1:16-cv-00651, 2018 WL 6427894 (D.N.J. Dec. 7, 2018); Reversed, Sanchez v. Sec'y United States Dep't of Homeland Sec., 967 F.3d 242 (3d Cir. 2020); Cert. granted, Sanchez v. Wolf, 141 S. Ct. 973 (2021)

Holding
- A Temporary Protected Status (TPS) recipient who entered the United States unlawfully is not eligible under §1255 for lawful permanent resident status merely by dint of his TPS.

Court membership
- Chief Justice John Roberts Associate Justices Clarence Thomas · Stephen Breyer; Samuel Alito · Sonia Sotomayor; Elena Kagan · Neil Gorsuch; Brett Kavanaugh · Amy Coney Barrett

Case opinion
- Majority: Kagan, joined by unanimous

Sanchez v. Mayorkas, 593 U.S. ___ (2021), was a United States Supreme Court case dealing with the ability for immigrants legally residing under temporary protected status to apply for permanent resident status through a green card. In a unanimous decision, the Court ruled in June 2021 that for immigrants who had entered the U.S. unlawfully, simply having temporary protected status did not make them eligible to apply for permanent resident status.

== Background ==
With the Immigration Act of 1990 and other laws passed since then, Congress gave the United States Attorney General authority to designate temporary protected status (TPS) for immigrants, regardless of how they arrived in the U.S., from countries where they would unable to return safely due situations to such as warfare or environmental disasters, as a humanitarian effort. One's TPS status remains active as long as the country is maintained on the Attorney General's list. As of 2021, about 400,000 immigrants have TPS status.

Jose Sanchez and Sonia Gonzales unlawfully entered the U.S. from El Salvador in 1997 and 1998, respectively. Following the January and February 2001 earthquakes in their native country, the couple applied for and received TPS. They continued to live in the U.S. in New Jersey, raising a family of four, with their youngest becoming a U.S. citizen. In 2014, the couple opted to apply for their green cards to become permanent residents. Citizenship and Immigration Services denied their application, stating that as the couple did not enter the country lawfully, they could not apply for permanent status.

The couple appealed this ruling to the United States District Court for the District of New Jersey. In 2018, the judge ruled for the couple, stating that the virtue of gaining TPS meant the couple was "maintaining lawful status" as immigrants and thus could qualify for permanent residence. The government appealed to the Third Circuit, which reversed the District Court's decision. There, the Third Circuit said that the TPS does not "constitute an admission" of legal immigration status.

== Supreme Court ==
The couple petitioned to the Supreme Court to review the Third Circuit's decision. The Court certified the case in January 2021, and held oral arguments on April 19, 2021.

The Court issued its unanimous decision on June 7, 2021, upholding the Third Circuit's ruling. Justice Elena Kagan wrote the opinion, denoting that the relevant immigration laws worked on two tracks. One track, applying for permanent resident status, "imposes an admission requirement twice over", as described by Kagan, requiring both inspection and admission into the U.S., and application pursuant this lawful admission. The other separate track is related to TPS, which Kagan wrote "That status protects them from removal and authorizes them to work here for as long as the T.P.S. designation lasts." Kagan wrote that the two tracks may meet if the immigrant entered the country lawfully, but this was distinctly different from lawful status to remain in the country: "Lawful status and admission, as the court below recognized are distinct concepts in immigration law: Establishing one does not necessarily establish the other."
