= Harrison v. NAACP =

- Supreme Court of the United States

Argued March 23–24, 1959 Decided June 8, 1959
- Full case name: Harrison, Attorney General of Virginia, et al. v. National Association for the Advancement of Colored People, et al.
- Citations: 360 U.S. 167 (more) 79 S. Ct. 1025; 3 L. Ed. 2d 1152; 1959 U.S. LEXIS 1760

Case history
- Prior: 159 F. Supp. 503 (E.D. Va. 1958); probable jurisdiction noted, 358 U.S. 807 (1958).
- Subsequent: NAACP v. Harrison, 202 Va. 142; 116 S.E.2d 55 (1960); cert. granted, 365 U.S. 842 (1961); reversed, NAACP v. Button, 371 U.S. 415 (1963).

Holding
- District court erred in deciding the constitutionality of state law before state courts had a reasonable opportunity to construe them.

Court membership
- Chief Justice Earl Warren Associate Justices Hugo Black · Felix Frankfurter; William O. Douglas · Tom C. Clark; John M. Harlan II · William J. Brennan Jr. Charles E. Whittaker · Potter Stewart

Case opinions
- Majority: Harlan, joined by Black, Frankfurter, Clark, Whittaker, Stewart
- Dissent: Douglas, joined by Warren, Brennan

Harrison v. NAACP, 360 U.S. 167 (1959), is a 6-to-3 ruling by the Supreme Court of the United States which held that the United States District Court for the Eastern District of Virginia should have abstained from deciding the constitutionality of three barratry, champerty, and maintenance laws in the state of Virginia until state courts had had a reasonable chance to construe them.

== Background ==
On September 10, 1956, as part of the Massive Resistance movement, 16 bills were introduced in a special session of the Virginia General Assembly aimed at curbing the National Association for the Advancement of Colored People (NAACP) in Virginia. Five of the bills expanded the state's definitions of barratry, champerty, and maintenance. Barratry is the "stirring up" of litigation by inducing individuals or organizations to sue when they otherwise would not. Champerty occurs when a third party (not the plaintiff nor their legal counsel) assumes the risks and financial costs of a lawsuit in return for a portion of the monetary award. Maintenance occurs when a third party supports or promotes a litigant's suit in such a way as to prolong litigation when the parties would otherwise have brought an end to litigation or settled the suit. The eleven other bills collectively required the following groups to file a financial report and membership list annually with state: any group which promotes or opposes state legislation aimed at any race; any organization attempting to influence public opinion on behalf of any race; or any group raising funds to employ legal counsel in connection with racial litigation. By the end of the special session, these had been collapsed into six "legal business" bills. They were significantly amended in committee to meet the constitutional concerns of a number of legislators. The bills were merged so that only five were reported from the committee and passed by the Assembly.

Governor Thomas B. Stanley signed these legal business bills into law on September 29, 1956. They went into effect immediately.

The Virginia NAACP filed suit in federal court in 1956 against the Attorney General of Virginia to have the five barratry, champerty, and maintenance laws thrown out as an unconstitutional infringement of the 1st Amendment rights of freedom of speech and freedom of assembly. In 1957, Virginians elected Albertis S. Harrison, Jr. Attorney General, so he was the named defendant when the three judge panel of the U.S. District Court of the Eastern District of Virginia issued its decision in NAACP v. Harrison, the panel agreed that three of the laws were unconstitutional, but reserved judgment on the other two laws pending interpretation by state courts (which had not yet ruled on the laws' legality).

The state appealed, and the U.S. Supreme Court granted certiorari. Thurgood Marshall argued for the NAACP; David J. Mays and J. Segar Gravatt argued for the state (attorney general Harrison having delegated the responsibility of defending the statute to private attorney Mays).

== Opinion of the Court ==
=== Majority ===
Associate Justice John Marshall Harlan II wrote the majority opinion, joined by Associate Justices Hugo Black, Felix Frankfurter, Tom C. Clark, Charles Evans Whittaker, and Potter Stewart.

The Supreme Court had, 18 years earlier, confronted the issue of how to avoid constitutional rulings where a resolution in state court might make such decisions unnecessary. This rule had been laid down in Railroad Comm'n of Tex. v. Pullman Co., 312 U. S. 496 (1941).

Under this rule, Harlan concluded that the issue was not yet ripe for federal action. Federal courts, he wrote, should not address the constitutionality of state laws, especially those laws which were new or open to reasonable interpretation, until state courts had a reasonable period of time to interpret them. To meet this test, the Supreme Court had to determine whether the laws in question could be reasonably interpreted in more than one way. Harlan said that there was reasonable room for alternative legal construction by state courts. State courts, he said, needed to generate a complete record (which included the possibility of limiting interpretation) so that federal courts could more accurately rule on the issues raised.

The judgment was vacated and the case remanded back of the district court, with instructions that the federal court should retain jurisdiction over the cases until such time as Virginia courts had construed them.

=== Dissent ===
Associate Justice William O. Douglas dissented, joined by Chief Justice Earl Warren and Associate Justice William J. Brennan, Jr.

Douglas did not dispute that Railroad Comm'n was an appropriate precedent. However, he argued that in certain cases, the precedent could be used as a tactic to delay justice. The case at hand presented unique, pressing issues regarding fundamental civil rights, he said, "It seems plain to me that it was the District Court's duty to provide this remedy," he concluded. "Where state laws made such an assault as these do on our decisions and a State has spoken defiantly against the constitutional rights of the citizens, reasons for showing deference to local institutions vanish."

Douglas would have upheld the lower court's ruling against the three laws, and also thought that the majority erred by remanding the other two laws back to state courts for interpretation (rather than holding them unconstitutional).

== Bibliography ==
- Dickson, Del. The Supreme Court in Conference, 1940–1985: The Private Discussions Behind Nearly 300 Supreme Court Decisions. New York: Oxford University Press, 2001.
