= In re Primus =

- Supreme Court of the United States

Argued January 16, 1978 Decided May 30, 1978
- Full case name: In re Edna Smith Primus
- Citations: 436 U.S. 412 (more) 98 S. Ct. 1893; 56 L. Ed. 2d 417

Case history
- Prior: In re Smith, 268 S.C. 259, 233 S.E.2d 301 (1977); probable jurisdiction noted, 434 U.S. 814 (1977).

Holding
- Solicitation of prospective litigants by nonprofit organizations that engage in litigation as a form of political expression and political association constitutes expressive and associational conduct entitled to First Amendment protection.

Court membership
- Chief Justice Warren E. Burger Associate Justices William J. Brennan Jr. · Potter Stewart; Byron White · Thurgood Marshall; Harry Blackmun · Lewis F. Powell Jr. William Rehnquist · John P. Stevens

Case opinions
- Majority: Powell, joined by Burger, Stewart, White, Blackmun, Stevens; Marshall (all but the first paragraph of part VI)
- Concurrence: Blackmun
- Concurrence: Marshall (in part)
- Dissent: Rehnquist
- Brennan took no part in the consideration or decision of the case.

Laws applied
- U.S. Const. amends. I, XIV

In re Primus, 436 U.S. 412 (1978), was a United States Supreme Court case in which the Court held that solicitation of prospective litigants by nonprofit organizations that engage in litigation as a form of political expression and political association constitutes expressive and associational conduct entitled to First Amendment protection.

== Background ==
Edna Smith Primus, the first Black woman to graduate from the University of South Carolina School of Law, was a pro bono attorney for the South Carolina affiliate of the American Civil Liberties Union (ACLU). South Carolina had a policy of sterilizing certain women as a condition of receiving welfare. Primus sent letters to women who had been thus sterilized, offering the ACLU's legal assistance. The South Carolina Supreme Court's disciplinary board reprimanded Primus for violating state bar rules against soliciting business. The South Carolina Supreme Court approved the discipline. Primus appealed to the U.S. Supreme Court.

== Opinion of the Court ==
The U.S. Supreme Court overturned the discipline, ruling that solicitation of prospective litigants by nonprofit organizations that engage in litigation as a form of political expression and political association constitutes expressive and associational conduct entitled to First Amendment protection.

The opinion in In re Primus was released the same day as another First Amendment case relating to attorney solicitation, Ohralik v. Ohio State Bar Association, 436 U.S. 447 (1978), which upheld a ban on attorney solicitation of accident victims within 30 days of the incident. The holdings were distinguished on account of the political expression and association elements present in Primus and absent in Ohralik.

== See also ==
- NAACP v. Button, 371 U.S. 415 (1963)
- Ambulance chasing
