= Northern Virginia Law School =

Defunct, unaccredited law school in Virginia, USA

Coordinates: 38°48′41.0″N 77°6′4.3″W

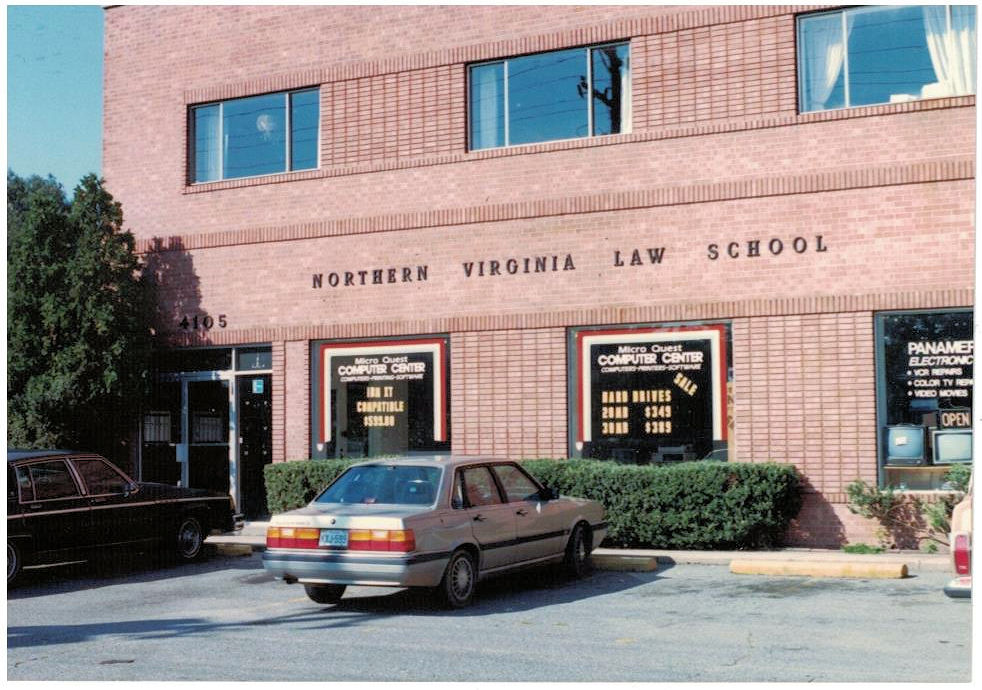
Northern Virginia Law School at 4105 Duke Street, in Alexandria, Virginia

Northern Virginia Law School was a law school in northern Virginia from the 1980s to the 1990s. It was last located at 4105 Duke Street, in Alexandria, Virginia, and was founded by Alfred Avins. It had degree granting authority accreditation from the Virginia Council of Higher Education to confer the Juris Doctor degree and for a limited time its graduates were permitted to sit for the Virginia Bar Exam. Primarily a weekend law school, it was founded as the District of Columbia Law School in the late 1970s, holding classes in the historic Colorado Building, 1341 G Street N.W. in Washington DC, before its move to Virginia in 1980. It housed the Dean Alfred Avins Law Library, a book collection of the dean that contained over 45,000 legal volumes, but had to close after unsuccessful attempts at obtaining full and permanent accreditation.

== Notable alumni ==
- Ruth Kerr Jakoby, Dean of the Antioch School of Law
