= Ruth Kerr Jakoby =

American neurosurgeon

- Born: September 2, 1929 (age 96); Palo Alto, California
- Education: M.D. Columbia University College of Physicians & Surgeons
- Occupation: Neurosurgeon
- Children: 2

Ruth Kerr Jakoby (born September 2, 1929) is an American neurosurgeon.

== Biography ==
Ruth Kerr Jakoby was born on September 2, 1929, in Palo Alto, California. She completed medical school at the Columbia University College of Physicians and Surgeons in 1956. She completed her residency through George Washington University in 1959.

=== Medical experience ===
Dr. Jakoby opened her own private practice in 1959. Just two years after completing her residency, she became the first female Diplomate of the American Board of Neurological Surgery in 1961. In 1964, she would become a Fellow of the American College of Surgeons. Dr. Jakoby served as the Chief of the Spinal Cord Injury Service at the VA Hospital in Houston, Texas from 1977-1979. While serving as the Chief, she also taught at Baylor College of Medicine as an Associate Professor of Neurosurgery.

=== Beyond medicine ===
Through her experiences in medicine, Dr. Jakoby became increasingly interested in the legal issues related to the medical field. She attended Northern Virginia Law School, and she obtained her J.D. degree in 1986. In 1989 she went on to become the Dean of the Antioch School of Law. Dr. Jakoby primarily focuses on "antitrust issues and mergers of medical, legal and educational institutions."

=== Personal life ===
Her father Paul Francis Kerr was a mineralogist and member of the Manhattan Project. Jakoby has two sons, Michael and Robert.
