= United States v. Palomar-Santiago =

2021 United States Supreme Court case regarding immigration

US v. Palomar-Santiago
- Supreme Court of the United States

Argued April 27, 2021 Decided May 24, 2021
- Full case name: United States v. Refugio Palomar-Santiago
- Docket no.: 20-437
- Citations: 593 U.S. ___ (more)
- Argument: Oral argument

Holding
- All three requirements of 8 U.S.C. § 1326(d) are mandatory.

Court membership
- Chief Justice John Roberts Associate Justices Clarence Thomas · Stephen Breyer; Samuel Alito · Sonia Sotomayor; Elena Kagan · Neil Gorsuch; Brett Kavanaugh · Amy Coney Barrett

Case opinion
- Majority: Sotomayor, unanimous

United States v. Palomar-Santiago, No. 20-437, 593 U.S. ___ (2021) was a United States Supreme Court case that dealt with the three requirements under which a deportation order may be dismissed, as listed in 8 USC § 1326(d). The question brought before the Court was whether Palomar-Santiago may be excused from meeting all three requirements, given that the offense he was initially deported for was subsequently found no longer deportable. The Court held that all three requirements must be met in order to dismiss a deportation order.

== Background ==
=== Facts of the case ===
In 1990, the respondent, Refugio Palomar-Santiago, was granted lawful permanent resident status, colloquially known as a green card. A year later in 1991, Palomar-Santiago was charged with a felony for driving under the influence (DUI) in California. In 1998, he received a Notice to Appear from the Immigration and Naturalization Service (INS) which stated that he was subject for removal for his DUI conviction, which at the time, was considered an aggravated felony. After the hearing, the immigration judge ordered Palomar-Santiago to be removed. Palomar-Santiago waived his right to appeal, and was then deported to Mexico.

Six years later, the Supreme Court held that a DUI offense is not a deportable offense in Leocal v. Ashcroft (2004). In 2017, Palomar-Santiago was found in the United States, and he was charged with unlawful reentry after removal. Palomar-Santiago moved to dismiss this charge, citing Leocal v. Ashcroft. In 2020, the U.S. District Court for the District of Nevada granted Palomar-Santiago's motion, and the U.S. Court of Appeals for the Ninth Circuit affirmed. The Ninth Circuit based their decision on United States v. Ochoa (2017), a Court of Appeals case decided by the Ninth Circuit, which held that a noncitizen may be excused from meeting the first two requirements of 8 USC § 1362(d), given that the noncitizen was deported for an offense now considered a non-deportable offense.

=== Relevant laws ===
==== "Removal" vs. "deportation" ====
The terms "removal" and "deportation" are practically synonymous with each other. Legally, the term "deportation" was replaced by the term "removal" with the passing of the Immigration and Nationality Act (INA) of 1996, also known as Illegal Immigration Reform and Immigrant Responsibility Act of 1996 (IIRIRA).

==== Aggravated felony ====
An aggravated felony is a term that describes a category of criminal offenses that carry consequences for noncitizens. A crime of violence is included in the list of criminal offenses that are considered an aggravated felony. A noncitizen charged with an offense considered an aggravated felony is deportable.

At the time of Palomar-Santiago's deportation in 1998, a DUI was considered a crime of violence, and thus an aggravated felony. This changed with the Supreme Court decision in Leocal v. Ashcroft (2004), in which the Court held that a "higher mens rea" is needed for a DUI to be considered a crime of violence.

==== Reentry after removal ====
It is a crime for a noncitizen to return to the United States without authorization after they have been deported.

Originally, noncitizens could not use the invalidity of their original deportation as an affirmative defense. This changed with the Supreme Court decision in United States v. Mendoza-Lopez (1987), in which the Court held that under the right to due process, a collateral challenge to a deportation order must be available. As a result, Congress enacted 8 USC § 1326(d).

==== Challenging a deportation order ====
At the center of United States v. Palomar-Santiago (2021) is the statute listing the requirements for challenging a deportation order, which are described in 8 USC § 1326(d), and goes as follows:

(d) Limitation on collateral attack on underlying deportation order

In a criminal proceeding under this section, an alien may not challenge the validity of the deportation order described in subsection (a)(1) or subsection (b) unless the alien demonstrates that—

1. the alien exhausted any administrative remedies that may have been available to seek relief against the order;
2. the deportation proceedings at which the order was issued improperly deprived the alien of the opportunity for judicial review; and
3. the entry of the order was fundamentally unfair.

== Outcome ==
The issue presented to the court was whether a noncitizen was excused from meeting the first two requirements for challenging a deportation order when that deportation order was based on an offense that is no longer considered deportable? The Court held that no, a noncitizen is not excused from meeting the first two requirements for challenging their deportation order when their deportation order was based on an offense that is no longer deportable. Each of the three requirements for challenging a deportation order listed in 8 USC § 1326(d) is mandatory. The Supreme Court thus reversed the Ninth Circuit's decision and remanded it back to the Ninth Circuit for further proceedings.

=== Opinion ===
Judge Sonia Sotomayor delivered the opinion of the Court. It was a unanimous ruling.

The respondent had two main arguments, both of which the Court found unconvincing. The respondent first argued that further administrative review is not available because noncitizens cannot recognize if they have a substantial basis for an appeal. They used Ross v. Blake (2016) for support, in which the Supreme Court acknowledged that while administrative remedies for inmates officially exist, the capability of obtaining administrative remedies does not always exist. The Court found this argument unconvincing because Ross v. Blake does not state that the "substantive complexity of an affirmative defense" alone does not make further administrative review unavailable. The immigration judge's error on the deportation order does not excuse the noncitizen from having to meet the requirements.

The respondent then argued that the § 1326(d) requirements only apply when the deportation order was "procedurally flawed rather than substantively invalid," and, since substantively invalid orders were invalid from the beginning, they cannot be challenged. Again, the Court found this argument unconvincing, finding that the respondent's argument ignores the plain meanings of "challenge" and "collateral attack."

Additionally, the Court found the Ninth Circuit's decision in United States v. Ochoa (2017) to be incompatible with the § 1326(d) statute. This is because the requirements are connected by the word "and," which means defendants are required to meet all three requirements.

== Significance ==
The Supreme Court decision in United States v. Palomar-Santiago (2021) has been influential to lower court cases regarding the validity of deportation orders. For example, it has been cited in the Ninth Circuit cases United States v. Portillo-Gonzalez (2023) and United States v. Castellanos-Avalos (2022).
