= NAACP v. Button =

- Supreme Court of the United States

Argued November 8, 1961 Reargued October 9, 1962 Decided January 14, 1963
- Full case name: National Association for the Advancement of Colored People v. Button, Attorney General of Virginia, et al.
- Citations: 371 U.S. 415 (more) 83 S. Ct. 328; 9 L. Ed. 2d 405; 1963 U.S. LEXIS 2398

Case history
- Prior: NAACP v. Harrison, 202 Va. 142; 116 S.E.2d 55 (1960); cert. granted, 365 U.S. 842 (1961).

Holding
- Virginia laws on barratry, champerty, and maintenance violate the First and Fourteenth Amendments.

Court membership
- Chief Justice Earl Warren Associate Justices Hugo Black · William O. Douglas; Tom C. Clark · John M. Harlan II; William J. Brennan Jr. · Potter Stewart; Byron White · Arthur Goldberg

Case opinions
- Majority: Brennan, joined by Warren, Black, Douglas, Goldberg
- Concurrence: Douglas
- Concur/dissent: White
- Dissent: Harlan, joined by Clark, Stewart

Laws applied
- U.S. Const. Amend. I; XIV

NAACP v. Button, 371 U.S. 415 (1963), is a ruling by the Supreme Court of the United States which held that the reservation of jurisdiction by a federal district court did not bar the U.S. Supreme Court from reviewing a state court's ruling, and also overturned certain laws enacted by the state of Virginia in 1956 as part of the Stanley Plan and massive resistance, as violating the First and Fourteenth Amendments to the United States Constitution. The statutes struck down by the Supreme Court (and one overturned by the Virginia Supreme Court after the 1959 remand in Harrison v. NAACP) had expanded the definitions of the traditional common law crimes of champerty and maintenance, as well as barratry, and had been targeted at the NAACP and its civil rights litigation.

== Background ==
After the U.S. Supreme Court decisions in Brown v. Board of Education, especially the 1955 decision known as Brown II, which ordered federal courts to enforce the 1954 decision "with all deliberate speed", U.S. Senator Harry F. Byrd declared a policy of Massive Resistance to desegregation of Virginia's schools. Meanwhile, the National Association for the Advancement of Colored People (NAACP) was filing legal challenges to segregation in various Virginia schools. Griffin v. County School Board of Prince Edward County had been filed in 1951, and became a companion case decided along with Brown. In January 1956, Virginia voters called for a limited state constitutional convention to allow tuition grants, which could be used at segregation academies and thus undercut the desegregation required by Brown. That constitutional convention was held in March 1956.

On September 29, 1956, the Virginia General Assembly met in a special session and passed more than two dozen statutes concerning segregation and the schools, which Governor Thomas B. Stanley soon signed into law and which became known as the "Stanley Plan." Some concerned tuition grants. Seven of the new statutes concerned NAACP practices in Virginia, and of those, five regulated lawyers: expanding the definitions of the common law legal ethical violations called barratry, champerty, maintenance, running and capping. Barratry is the "stirring up" of litigation by inducing individuals or organizations to sue when they otherwise would not. Champerty occurs when a third party (not the plaintiff or nor their legal counsel) assumes the risks and financial costs of a lawsuit in return for a portion of the monetary award. Maintenance occurs when a third party supports or promotes a litigant's suit to prolong litigation when the parties would otherwise have brought an end to litigation or settled the suit. The bills were specifically aimed at curbing the NAACP, which many segregationists believed was "stirring up" integration lawsuits against the Commonwealth. By 1956, the NAACP had filed fifteen desegregation petitions with local school boards.

The new laws also collectively required annual filing of financial reports and membership lists for any group that promotes or opposes state legislation aimed at (1) any race, (2) any organization attempting to influence public opinion on behalf of any race, or (3) any group raising funds to employ legal counsel in connection with racial litigation. Virginia's legislature also established two new legislative committees composed of lawyer members of both houses, which investigated NAACP practices both in light of and using the new statutes. One chaired by John B. Boatwright became known as the "Boatwright Committee"; another chaired by Byrd's son-in-law James M. Thomson became known as the "Thomson Committee". This was similar to the approach taken by several other southern states, decided as Shelton v. Tucker, 364 U.S. 479 (1958) (overturning Arkansas laws requiring public schoolteachers to disclose every organization to which they belonged or made donations to during the previous five years; and prohibiting NAACP members from holding any state job), NAACP v. Alabama ex rel. Patterson, 357 U.S. 449 (1958) (overturning an Alabama attorney general Patterson's attempt to enjoin all NAACP activities in the state) and Louisiana ex rel. Gremillion v. NAACP, 366 U.S. 293 (1961) (overturning Louisiana's attempt to prevent NAACP from doing business in the state).

The Virginia NAACP soon filed suit in federal court in 1956 against the five new legal ethics laws, and also supported Quaker printer David Scull when he was subjected to aggressive testimony by the Thomson Committee. Both cases reached the U.S. Supreme Court around the same time, and were argued after January 19, 1959 (Robert E. Lee's birthday, a holiday in Virginia), when both a three-judge federal panel in James v. Almond and the Virginia Supreme Court in Harrison v. Day invalidated many other provisions of the Stanley Plan. Then on May 4, 1959, the Supreme Court unanimously threw out the contempt conviction the Thomson Committee had obtained in Scull v. Virginia ex rel. Committee on Law Reform and Racial Activities.

The case that ultimately became this one had been filed by the NAACP against the Attorney General of Virginia (first J. Lindsay Almond then when he resigned to run for governor his interim successor Kenneth Cartwright Patty, and later other successors), to have the five barratry, champerty, maintenance, running and capping laws thrown out as an unconstitutional infringement of its members' rights under the 1st Amendment to freedom of speech and freedom of assembly. The district court overturned three of the laws on constitutional grounds, and remanded the remaining two to state courts. The newly elected Attorney General, Albertis S. Harrison, Jr., appealed to the U.S. Supreme Court, although he delegated the case to outside counsel David J. Mays who argued it on March 23 and 24, 1959, with future justice Thurgood Marshall arguing on behalf of the NAACP.

In Harrison v. NAACP, 360 U.S. 167 (June 8, 1959), the U.S. Supreme Court accepted Mays' arguments and held that the federal district court should have abstained from deciding the laws' constitutionality until state courts had had a reasonable chance to construe them.

The NAACP then pursued its suit in state court, suing Harrison and later substituting his successors as Virginia Attorney General (initially Frederick Gray then Robert Button, since Harrison resigned to run for governor, and was elected on the Democratic ticket with Button), in the Circuit Court of the City of Richmond to have the two remaining statutes overturned on constitutional grounds. During the three day trial, the NAACP (represented by Robert L. Carter of New York and Oliver W. Hill of Richmond) called its Executive Secretary W. Lester Banks to establish the harms the new provisions had caused, as membership dropped significantly even though the NAACP refused to disclose its membership lists as required by the new laws. Attorneys representing Virginia's attorney general questioned several Virginia attorneys who handled NAACP cases, as well as more than a dozen plaintiffs in such actions.

Meanwhile, in February 1960, the NAACP and other organizations began sit-ins to support desegregation. The Virginia State Bar, following the reports of the Boatwright committee, also initiated disbarment proceedings against NAACP attorney Samuel W. Tucker in Emporia, Virginia based on the expanded laws. The NAACP brought in attorney Robert Ming from Chicago to defend Tucker, and after two years of litigation, state judges dismissed the charges against Tucker in early 1962. This did, however, keep desegregation progress slow. By the fall of 1960, NAACP litigation had resulted in some desegregation in eleven localities, and the number of at least partially desegregated districts had slowly risen to 20 in the fall of 1961, 29 in the fall of 1962, and 55 (out of 130 school districts) in 1963 (only 3,700 black pupils or 1.6% attended school with whites even in 1963). However, the Richmond court refused to declare the new attorney discipline laws unconstitutional. The NAACP appealed to the Virginia Supreme Court of Appeals, which upheld one statute but not the other.

The NAACP appealed again to the U.S. Supreme Court, which granted certiorari. While Mays (who had argued the case previously before the U.S. and Virginia Supreme Courts) supervised the brief and attended the oral arguments (Robert L. Carter arguing for the NAACP), due to time constraints Mays let Wickham handle what turned out to be two arguments. The case was argued on November 8, 1961 and reargued on October 9, 1962, due to the resignation of two justices (Charles E. Whittaker and Felix Frankfurter) and their replacement (after a Senate confirmation process) by Byron White and Arthur Goldberg. Both resigned justices were in the majority in Harrison v. NAACP; both new justices were in the majority in this decision.

== Ruling ==
The opinion was issued on January 14, 1963.

=== Majority ===
Associate Justice William J. Brennan, Jr. wrote the decision for the majority, and was joined by Chief Justice Earl Warren and Associate Justices Hugo Black and Arthur Goldberg. Associate Justice William O. Douglas concurred in the decision, but wrote an opinion expressing further views on the subject.

For Brennan, the first issue before the court was a procedural one. In Harrison v. NAACP, the Supreme Court had ordered the district court to remand the case back to the state courts for disposition. However, the district court was to still maintain jurisdiction over the issue. The question before the Supreme Court was whether the NAACP could appeal the Virginia Supreme Court of Appeals' ruling directly to the U.S. Supreme Court, or was the NAACP required to go through the federal district court again? Brennan held that although the federal district court had reserved jurisdiction, this did not impinge on the Supreme Court's authority to review a supreme state court's decision.

Having asserted the Supreme Court's jurisdiction over the matter, Brennan now turned to the constitutional issues. The Commonwealth of Virginia argued that it was not regulating the free speech of individual lawyers and citizens, but rather that of a corporation (the National Association for the Advancement of Colored People), and that the U.S. Constitution did not protect the free speech rights of corporations as strongly as it did that of people. Brennan disagreed: Corporations, he said, not only have rights equal to that of individuals, but a corporation may also assert free speech and free assembly rights on behalf of its members. The nature of these free speech rights in particular, Brennan said, were not limited to "abstract discussion", but included lawful advocacy against government intrusion on this and other rights. Litigation, too, he said, was protected. Litigation was not merely a mechanism for resolving differences between two private parties but a constitutionally protected form of political expression. Furthermore, litigation is constitutionally protected because it is one of the few lawful means by which equal protection of the laws can be enforced. The state of Virginia had argued that organizational activity (collecting membership dues, hiring attorneys, advocating lawsuits, etc.) of the kind the NAACP engaged in was not literally a speech act, a petition for redress of grievances, or assembly of the kind mentioned in the First Amendment. But Brennan and the majority disagreed, concluding that Court precedent clearly establishes that this kind of lawful activity is protected by the First and Fourteenth Amendments.

Relying on the authoritative construction of the acts by the Virginia Supreme Court of Appeals, Brennan noted that merely telling another individual that their rights have been violated and referring that person to an attorney or group of attorneys became a crime under the five statutes. This chilled the lawyers' and individual's First Amendment rights, and made the individual's ability to enforce its Fourteenth Amendment rights difficult, both of which were unconstitutional: "There thus inheres in the statute the gravest danger of smothering all discussion looking to the eventual institution of litigation on behalf of the rights of members of an unpopular minority."

The Virginia Supreme Court of Appeals had asserted that government had an interest in ensuring high professional standards in the legal community, and that it was not the state's intent to restrict freedom of expression. Brennan said this was no defense, for only the most compelling of governmental interests justifies an imposition on freedom of speech—and Court precedent had long established that a state's interest in prohibiting professional misconduct did not constitute a compelling interest. Virginia does have a governmental interest in regulating the practice of law, Brennan said, because litigation can be malicious: It can abuse the legal system for personal gain, it can be used to oppress others, and lay people can urge the use of the legal system for their own personal financial gain. But "the exercise ... of First Amendment rights to enforce constitutional rights through litigation, as a matter of law, cannot be deemed malicious." Yet First Amendment litigation is exactly the sort of activity the Virginia laws sought to bar. Furthermore, Virginia could not show at trial any substantive evil flowing from the NAACP's activities.

The judgment of the Virginia Supreme Court of Appeals was reversed.

=== Douglas' concurrence ===
Associate Justice Douglas concurred in the Court's ruling. He addressed the dissent by pointing out that not only the laws' legislative history, but both the district court and the Virginia Supreme Court of Appeals clearly found that the legislature passed them to discriminate against the NAACP and to circumvent the U.S. Supreme Court's rulings. "[T]hey make clear the purpose of the present law — ... to evade our prior decisions... The fact that the contrivance used is subtle and indirect is not material to the question."

=== White's concurrence and dissent ===
Associate Justice Byron White concurred in the Court's judgment, but dissented from its reasoning.

White thought that the five Virginia legal business laws unconstitutionally infringed on freedom of speech and the constitutionally protected lawful exercise of the court system to ensure the full exercise of those rights. A more narrowly drawn statute, White felt, may have passed constitutional scrutiny, but the majority's decision appeared unable to admit such an outcome. White would not have discussed the maliciousness of the NAACP's activities, as that issue was not properly before the Court.

=== Harlan's dissent ===
Associate Justice John Marshall Harlan II, who had written the majority opinion in Harrison v. NAACP, now wrote the dissent, joined only by Associate Justices Tom C. Clark and Potter Stewart.

Harlan argued that the record before the Court clearly showed that the lawyers working for the NAACP were members of the organization's legal staff, that NAACP policy and officers controlled the lawyers' actions, and that the NAACP did not merely represent clients who came to it but instead actively sought out very specific types of clients to advance its policy agenda. Thus the dissenters thought that the "normal" attorney-client relationship was often not present in the NAACP's relationships with its legal clients.

The dissenters thought the NAACP had violated not only the five new legal business laws, but also similar laws adopted more than 20 years earlier. Harlan noted that the Virginia Supreme Court of Appeals construed the five new legal business laws as not prohibiting the constitutional exercise of freedom of speech and freedom of assembly, and thought that should be determinative. The dissenters denied that litigation enjoyed strong constitutional protection, because it was only "associated" with freedom of expression, and the Virginia statutes only incidentally infringed on this speech. Furthermore, Harlan considered litigation conduct, which does not enjoy the same strong constitutional protection as speech. Harlan also disagreed with the majority's characterization of the NAACP's activities as free from financial gain, calling it not a typical (and protected) attorney-client relationship because the NAACP and its clients lacked enough common interests to avoid maliciousness. The dissenters argued that the Court had never before allowed constitutional lawsuits to avoid the rules of evidence, regulation of the law, legal ethics, or other state interests.

Harlan chided the majority for labeling the Virginia statutes vague and overbroad, arguing that neither the trial record nor the state courts' construction of the statutes had found the laws vague. Since Harlan would have upheld the statutes despite the First Amendment challenges, he thought the Fourteenth Amendment guarantees of due process of law and equal protection of the law not infringed.

== Consequences ==
The next year, the Supreme Court heard and decided Brotherhood of Railroad Trainmen v. Virginia ex rel. Virginia State Bar. Virginia's attempt to use its professional responsibility regulations to curtail union practices was again curtailed in another opinion authored by Justice Black, over the dissents of Justices Clark and Harlan. Justice Stewart did not participate in the Trainmen decision.

The NAACP v. Button decision, which approved the NAACP's "test case" strategy, also led to the growth of public interest law firms with other goals, such as less restrictive housing of the mentally ill, and even contesting the No Child Left Behind Act. However, those later class action cases also raised possible ethical problems of lawyers placing ideological motivations above actual client interests. The American Bar Association later adopted Model Rule of Professional Conduct 6.1 (applicable to lawyers working without charging clients) to distinguish those solicitations from others that violate legal ethics guidelines, although Justice Thurgood Marshall criticized that approach as benefiting primarily white establishment attorneys who could afford to work without pay, rather than increasing diversity within the bar, as NAACP practices had. Thus, in Ohralik v. Ohio State Bar Assn.,436 U.S. 447 (1978), the Supreme Court distinguished inappropriate for-profit client solicitations from the protected political speech in Button and the ACLU attorney in In re Primus, whom it found South Carolina improperly prosecuted for offering legal services for free to a woman who was involuntarily sterilized.
