= AMG Capital Management, LLC v. FTC =

- Supreme Court of the United States

Argued January 13, 2021 Decided April 22, 2021
- Full case name: AMG Capital Management, LLC, et al., v. Federal Trade Commission
- Docket no.: 19-508
- Citations: 593 U.S. ___ (more) 141 S. Ct. 1341; 209 L. Ed. 2d 361

Case history
- Prior: Motion for summary judgment granted in part and denied in part, FTC v. AMG Services, Inc., 29 F. Supp. 3d 1338 (D. Nev. 2014); Affirmed, FTC v. AMG Capital Management, LLC, 910 F.3d 417 (9th Cir. 2018); Cert. granted, 141 S. Ct. 194 (2020)

Holding
- Section 13(b) of the Federal Trade Commission Act does not authorize the Commission to seek or a court to award equitable monetary relief such as restitution or disgorgement.

Court membership
- Chief Justice John Roberts Associate Justices Clarence Thomas · Stephen Breyer; Samuel Alito · Sonia Sotomayor; Elena Kagan · Neil Gorsuch; Brett Kavanaugh · Amy Coney Barrett

Case opinion
- Majority: Breyer, joined by unanimous

Laws applied
- Federal Trade Commission Act

AMG Capital Management, LLC v. Federal Trade Commission, 593 U.S. ___ (2021), was a U.S. Supreme Court case dealing with the ability of the Federal Trade Commission (FTC) to seek monetary relief for restitution or disgorgement from those that it found in violation of trade practices. The Court ruled unanimously that the FTC had misused its authority granted by the Federal Trade Commission Act under Section 13(b) to obtain monetary relief.

== Background ==
Scott Tucker ran several payday loan service companies under several different names (including AMG Capital Management) over a fifteen-year period. The companies drew consumer complaints for charging excessively-high interest rates on the loans, with those using their services paying nearly triple what they had taken as a loan, charged through undisclosed fees. The Federal Trade Commission filed a formal civil suit against Tucker's companies in 2012 that asserted that the companies were deceiving consumers, and it sought to recover money that consumers had lost to those practices. Separately, Tucker was also criminally charged under RICO and TILA statutes. He was estimated to have cost over $2 billion to over 4.5 million consumers and was convicted on 17 counts in October 2017.

The civil case against Tucker's businesses was heard in the District Court of Nevada by Judge Gloria Navarro. Judge Navarro ruled in October 2016 against Tucker's businesses, granting the $1.27 billion (equivalent to $1.62 billion in 2024) in fees that the FTC had sought in monetary relief for consumers that were harmed by the businesses' practices. The ruling also barred Tucker from engaging in any further consumer lending.

Legal counsel for Tucker appealed the decision to the Ninth Circuit. In addition to challenging the legality of the lending practices, his counsel also questioned the authority of the FTC to seek monetary damages for restitution under their charter, the Federal Trade Commission Act (FTC Act). Tucker's counsel referred to 15 U.S.C. § 53(b) (also known as Section 13(b) of the FTC Act), which grants the ability to seek injunctive relief in court against those found violating trade practices, a measure added by 1973 amendment to the FTC Act. Tucker's counsel questioned if the amendment was intended to include seeking equitable relief for restitution or disgorgement. The FTC had presumed §13(b) provided that allowance and heavily used the amended language since its introduction to seek monetary relief for consumers that were financially impacted by those the agency had found in violation of fair trade practices. The practice had been backed by prior case laws at lower courts, including FTC v. Cephalon, Inc. and FTC v. Mylan Labs., Inc. The three-judge panel ruled unanimously to uphold the District Court's ruling, rejecting the counsel's argument about the legality of their lending practices and asserting that the FTC had the authority to seek monetary relief under the FTC Act.

== Supreme Court ==
Tucker's counsel petitioned the Supreme Court to hear the case against the FTC, specifically on the question of whether Section 13(b) of the FTC Act allows the FTC to seek monetary relief. The Ninth Circuit's decision was in alignment with most other circuit courts and numerous FTC cases before, but Tucker's counsel had found that the Seventh Circuit had ruled in the 2019 case FTC v. Credit Bureau Center that Section 13(b) does not give the FTC that authority, which created a circuit split. The Supreme Court granted certiorari to the case in July 2020.

Oral arguments were heard on January 13, 2021. Court observers stated that the Justices appeared to be concerned that ruling in favor of Tucker although an appropriate textualist interpretation of the FTC Act would upend decades of precedent set by the courts.

The Supreme Court issued its decision on April 22, 2021. In a unanimous decision authored by Justice Stephen Breyer, the Court found that the FTC did not have the authority under Section 13(b) of the FTC Act to seek equitable monetary relief, overturned the lower court decisions, and remanded the case for review. Breyer wrote that the FTC could engage in other processes to seek monetary relief for consumers, or "it is, of course, free to ask Congress to grant it further remedial authority."

== Reaction to decision ==
The National Law Review said that the decision will curtail the FTC's powers to seek restitution in court. Acting FTC Chair Rebecca Slaughter said that the Supreme Court had "ruled in favor of scam artists" and called on Congress to strengthen the FTC's powers. Senate Commerce Committee Chair Maria Cantwell also called for new legislation in the wake of the decision.
