= San Antonio v. Hotels.com, L. P. =

- Supreme Court of the United States

Decided May 27, 2021
- Full case name: San Antonio v. Hotels.com, L. P.
- Docket no.: 20-334
- Citations: 593 U.S. ___ (more)

Holding
- Federal Rule of Appellate Procedure 39 does not permit a district court to alter a court of appeals’ allocation of the costs listed in subdivision (e) of that rule.

Court membership
- Chief Justice John Roberts Associate Justices Clarence Thomas · Stephen Breyer; Samuel Alito · Sonia Sotomayor; Elena Kagan · Neil Gorsuch; Brett Kavanaugh · Amy Coney Barrett

Case opinion
- Majority: Alito, joined by unanimous

Laws applied
- Fed. R. App. P. 39

San Antonio v. Hotels.com, L. P., 593 U.S. ___ (2021), was a United States Supreme Court case in which the Court held that Federal Rule of Appellate Procedure 39 does not permit a district court to alter a court of appeals’ allocation of the costs listed in subsection (e) of that rule. Rule 39 is about awarding the costs of the appeal to the victor, and subsection (e) is about the taxation of such an award.
