= Kulko v. Superior Court =

- Supreme Court of the United States

Decided May 15, 1978
- Full case name: Kulko v. Superior Court
- Citations: 436 U.S. 84 (more)

Holding
- A parent allowing a child to overstay an agreed parenting plan in another state does not establish minimum contacts for the purpose of personal jurisdiction over that parent.

Court membership
- Chief Justice Warren E. Burger Associate Justices William J. Brennan Jr. · Potter Stewart; Byron White · Thurgood Marshall; Harry Blackmun · Lewis F. Powell Jr. William Rehnquist · John P. Stevens

Case opinions
- Majority: Marshall
- Dissent: Brennan, joined by White, Powell

Laws applied
- U.S. Const. Amend. XIV

Kulko v. Superior Court, 436 U.S. 84 (1978), was a United States Supreme Court case in which the court held that a parent allowing a child to overstay an agreed parenting plan in another state does not establish minimum contacts for the purpose of personal jurisdiction over that parent.

== Background ==
The two parents in this case were New York domiciliaries who married in 1959 in California during the father's three-day stopover while he was en route to overseas military duty. After the marriage, the mother returned to New York, as did the father following his tour of duty and a 24-hour stopover in California. In 1961 and 1962, a son and daughter were born to them in New York, where the family resided together until March 1972, when the parents separated. The mother then moved to California. Under a separation agreement, executed by both parties in New York, the children were to remain with the father during the school year but with the mother during specified vacations, and the father agreed to pay the mother $3,000 per year in child support for the periods when the children were in her custody. The mother, after obtaining a divorce in Haiti, which incorporated the terms of the separation agreement, returned to California.

In December 1973, the daughter, at her request and with her father's consent, joined her mother in California, and remained there during the school year, spending vacations with her father. The mother, without the father's consent, arranged for the son to join her in California about two years later. The mother then brought this action against the father in California to establish the Haitian divorce decree as a California judgment, to modify the judgment so as to award her full custody of the children, and to increase the father's child support obligations. The father, resisting the claim for increased support, appeared specially, claiming that he lacked sufficient "minimum contacts" with that State under International Shoe Co. v. Washington to warrant the State's assertion of personal jurisdiction over him.

The California Supreme Court, upholding lower court determinations adverse to the father, concluded that, where a nonresident defendant has caused an "effect" in the state by an act or omission outside the state, personal jurisdiction over the defendant arising from the effect may be exercised whenever "reasonable," and that such exercise was "reasonable" here because appellant had "purposely availed himself of the benefits and protections of California" by sending the daughter to live with her mother there, and that it was "fair and reasonable" for the defendant to be subject to personal jurisdiction for the support of both children.

== Opinion of the court ==
The Supreme Court issued an opinion on May 15, 1978. The court said that the facts of the case favored California for choice of law purposes, but being the choice-of-law forum does not entitle a state to personal jurisdiction.
