= David J. Mays =

American lawyer

David John Mays (November 22, 1896 – February 17, 1971) was an American lawyer and writer. He attempted to slow racial desegregation on behalf of Byrd Organization during the Massive Resistance era. Mays served as counsel to the Gray Commission which tried to formulate segregationists' response to the United States Supreme Court rulings in 1954 and 1955 in consolidated cases known as Brown v. Board of Education. He later unsuccessfully defended actions taken against NAACP attorneys (although he had argued against adoption of those laws and correctly predicted they would be overturned) and significantly unequal legislative reapportionment. In 2008 the University of Georgia Press published an annotated volume of excerpts of his diaries concerning the early years of Massive Resistance (1954-1959). In 1953, Mays won the Pulitzer Prize for Biography or Autobiography for Edmund Pendleton 1721-1803 (Harvard University Press, 1952), a biography of the late 18th-century Virginia politician and judge Edmund Pendleton.

== Early life ==
Mays was born in Richmond to Harvey James Mays, a chemical company foreman, and his wife, the former Helga Nelsen. His Danish immigrant grandfather, Rasmus Nelsen, founded the Nelsen funeral home in Richmond. He eventually had 10 brothers and sisters and attended public schools near his father's employment stations in Alabama and a suburb of Memphis, Tennessee. While he and his father traveled from Washington, D.C., to visit Vanderbilt University, they stopped in Ashland, Virginia, where the elder Mays renewed a friendship and the younger Mays ultimately decided to attend Randolph-Macon Academy. David Mays never received a degree from that institution, although he studied and achieved high grades both from 1914 to 1916 and 1919-1920.

Between these academic terms, he spent a summer selling reference books in southern Delaware, and against his father's wishes enlisted with the First Delaware Infantry for service on the Mexican border against Pancho Villa in 1916-1917 (although his unit never left Deming, New Mexico). He later served as a First Lieutenant in the U.S. Army Infantry with the American Expeditionary Force in France, although again he never reached the combat front before the war ended. Mays was a lifelong Democrat and nominal member of the Methodist Church, although he stopped supporting the denomination after it became involved in political activities, opposing the presidential candidacy of Al Smith because of his Catholic religion.

Mays kept diaries for almost every year between his college schooling and old age. On May 22, 1917, he went with his father to witness the Lynching of Ell Persons, a 51-year-old black woodcutter whom a 5,000 person mob pulled from a train in Memphis en route to a court appearance. Persons had been accused of the gruesome rape and decapitation of a 16-year-old white girl, Antoinette Rappel. However, the evidence was flimsy (supposedly images captured by her dying eyes, found after her exhumation, a now-discredited technique), his confession probably under duress, and Persons never received a trial. Mays was fascinated by the scene and mob violence and stood near Persons' head as the black man was chained to the ground, doused with gasoline and burned alive. No-one was ever indicted for either murder, and the lynching propelled creation of the Memphis branch of the NAACP.

After his military discharge and graduation from Randolph-Macon Academy, Mays attended the University of Richmond law school, and graduated with a LL.B. in 1924. Beginning in 1926, he held a lecturer position at that law school (until 1942), then served on its Board of Trustees (and ultimately wrote a history of the law school). That financial stability helped him to marry his cousin, Ruth Reams, despite the opposition of both families because of their consanguinity. She eventually would help her husband with his historical research and donated his papers to the Virginia Historical Society; they had no children.

== Legal career ==
Upon being admitted to the Virginia bar in 1923, Mays began working with one of his professors, John Randolph Tucker. Their firm, Tucker, Mays, Cabell and Moore (later, Mays, Valentine, Davenport and Moore) became one of Richmond's leading law and lobbying firms (and long after his death merged into Troutman Sanders. Mays came to specialize in corporate law, and published a textbook on Business Law in 1933. While his partner John Randolph Tucker represented the Virginia Bankers Association from 1933 until his death, Mays's major clients included the state trucking and meatpacking associations.

The Virginia Bar Association elected Mays its president for the 1958–1959 term. He also served as President of the Richmond Bar Association and was elected a Fellow of the American Bar Foundation and of the American College of Trial Lawyers. He was also a member of the American Bar Association, New York City Bar Association, Sigma Nu Phi and Phi Beta Kappa.

== Massive Resistance ==
Governor Thomas B. Stanley, allied with the Byrd Organization, appointed Mays as counsel to the Gray Commission (after its chairman, Garland "Peck" Gray), which was to craft Virginia's response to Brown v. Board of Education. Following Mays' advice, the commission created a local-option approach to desegregation. However, segregationists in Virginia became radicalized (in part through the rhetorical efforts of then-newspaperman James J. Kilpatrick and U.S. Senator Harry F. Byrd). By the time Virginia's legislature next met (in a special session) to consider the proposals, even Gray wanted to include what Mays thought were unconstitutional measures which courts would strike down, such as withholding funds from any school that allowed mixing of races. Mays thought the pupil assignment plan based on showings of disturbances of the peace might survive court scrutiny, and North Carolina did have success with that approach. Nonetheless, Mays helped draft parts of what became known as the Stanley Plan. State Senators Charles R. Fenwick, Hank Mann and John B. Boatwright also included laws to restrict practices of the NAACP. The Virginia legislature passed the amalgam in September 1956 and governor Stanley signed it into law. However, by January 1959, both federal courts and the Virginia Supreme Court had begun striking down major elements.

Mays resigned his position with the Gray Commission after the Stanley Plan appropriated more money to the Attorney General's office to fight desegregation. He and his firm were hired to handle legal challenges to the ethics of civil rights attorneys in what Mays called the "NAACP Cases". Those were challenges to the newly expanded state ethics laws brought by the NAACP through its attorneys Thurgood Marshall, Spottswood Robinson and Robert L. Carter (all of whom later became federal judges). Mays thought the Virginia State Bar would bring charges against Oliver Hill, but only an unsuccessful attempt was made to disbar Samuel W. Tucker. While the U.S. Supreme Court agreed with Mays' abstention argument (wait for state court interpretation) in Harrison v. NAACP in June 1959, and the Virginia Supreme Court only struck down one of the new laws against the NAACP the following year, the rest of the anti-NAACP laws in the Stanley Plan were ultimately stricken down in NAACP v. Button in 1963.

Meanwhile, in 1959 Mays addressed a subcommittee of the U.S. Senate on A Question of Intent: The States, Their Schools and the 14th Amendment.

Governor Stanley's successor, J. Lindsay Almond (also a Byrd ally), appointed Mays Chairman of the Virginia Commission on Constitutional Government (CCG), which became a major factor in Massive Resistance, although Mays had initially sought assurances it would not merely be another tool in the "school fight". Mays sought to use the CCG to attract Northern support for southern positions on constitutional issues. Eugene B. Sydnor Jr. of Richmond had suggested its creation in 1958, to assist in what he called defense of states rights. Not only did the CCG survive calls for its abolition by Republican gubernatorial candidate Ted Dalton in 1961, it lasted for a decade. Only the tuition assistance program to attend private schools (including "segregation academies") survived longer (until 1969). In what may have been the CCG's most influential period, Mays invited Republican Conservatives from Pennsylvania to Williamsburg in 1962 to explore setting up a similar commission in that state (which never occurred, due to the opposition of moderate governor William Scranton). The next year, Mays' fiery segregationist vice-chairman, James J. Kilpatrick of the Richmond News Leader, published an analysis of the post-Civil War Civil Rights Cases and two pamphlets: "Civil Rights and Legal Wrongs" attacking the Civil Rights bill proposed by President Kennedy and "Civil Rights and Federal Wrongs" attacking expansion of the Equal Employment Opportunity Commission.

Mays also handled voting rights litigation on Virginia's behalf through his firm. He argued and lost Davis v. Mann in 1953 and the following year unsuccessfully defended Virginia's legislative reapportionment before the Virginia Supreme Court in Wilkins v. Davis. In March 1965, Mays also testified against President Lyndon Johnson's voting rights bill before the U.S. House Judiciary Committee, as requested by U.S. Rep. William M. Tuck. In Hughes v. WMCA (1965), the Supreme Court issued a per curiam opinion denying Virginia's (and New York's) reapportionment arguments.

== Historical research ==
Mays also had an avocation for historical research, and after years of lunchtime research at the Library of Virginia and various dusty archives, published his two volume Edmund Pendleton biography, which won many accolades, including the Pulitzer Prize for Biography in 1953. He later edited and published a collection of Pendleton's correspondence. Mays managed to find many of Virginia's oldest court records, including some thought destroyed in the Confederate Army's evacuation fire of Richmond in 1864. At the time of his death, Mays was collaborating on editing the letters of John Taylor who like Pendleton lived in Caroline County, Virginia.

The Virginia Historical Society (on whose board Mays served for 28 years) and Library of Virginia (on whose board he also served) also honored Mays. He also served on the Board of the McGregor Library of the University of Virginia, and on the council of the Institute of Early American History and Culture (affiliated with the College of William and Mary).

== Death and legacy ==
Mays practiced law in Richmond until his death (after a debilitating illness) in 1971, and is buried in Hollywood Cemetery there. His widow donated his papers to the Virginia Historical Society in 1985, and the 25-year restriction on access has now expired.

== Bibliography ==
- Sketch of Judge Spencer Roane 1929
- Business Law, Byrd Press, Richmond Virginia, 19 September 1933
- Edmund Pendleton, 1721-1803: A Biography , Harvard University Press, 1952. Winner of the 1953 Pulitzer Prize for Biography or Autobiography.
- Edmund Pendleton, Letters and Papers
- In Pursuit of Excellence: History of the University of Richmond Law School, Richmond, 1970
- Report Of The Committee On Federal-State Relationships As Affected By Judicial Decisions Conference Of Chief Justices, foreword by David J. Mays
- Race Reason and Massive Resistance: The Diary of David J. Mays, 1954-1959. Edited by James R. Sweeney
