= Scrabble, Virginia =

Unincorporated community in Virginia, US

Coordinates: 38°34′55″N 78°09′34″W

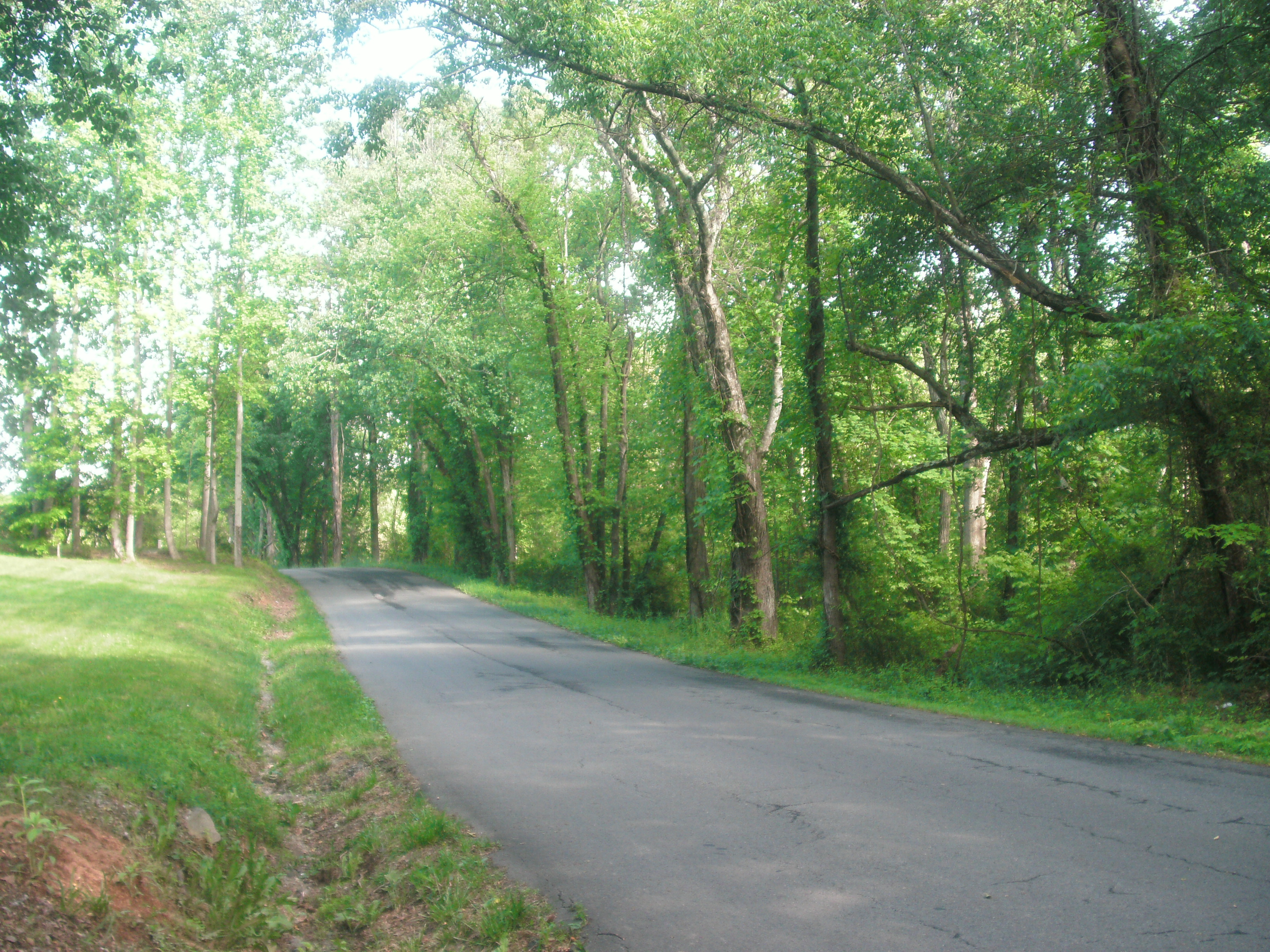
Scrabble Road near the Scrabble School

Scrabble is an unincorporated community in Rappahannock County, in the U.S. state of Virginia.
