= Ambulance chasing =

Soliciting for legal clients at a disaster site

Ambulance chasing, also known as barratry or capping, is an American term that refers to a lawyer soliciting for clients at a disaster site. The term "ambulance chasing" comes from the stereotype of lawyers who follow ambulances to the emergency room to find clients. "Ambulance chaser" is used as a derogatory term for a personal injury lawyer. Ambulance chasing is also associated with runners and cappers, non-attorneys who are hired by lawyers to seek out client leads (such as through trawling social media feeds or directly soliciting the attorneys' services towards victims).

== History ==
In 1881, Edward Watkin of the South Eastern Railway (England) complained about attorneys who solicited business from passengers after accidents:

We had an accident, I may tell you, at Forrest-hill two years ago. Well, there was a gentleman—an attorney in the train. He went round to all the people in the train and gave them his card; and, having distributed all the cards in his card-case, he went round and expressed extreme regret to the others that he could not give them a card; but he gave them his name as ‘So and So’, his place was in ‘Such a street’, and the ‘No, So and So’ in the City. That was touting for business.

"Now, there is a very admirable body called the 'Law Association'", Watkin added. "Why does not the Law Association take hold of cases of that kind?"

== Description ==
Ambulance chasing is prohibited in the United States by state rules that follow Rule 7.3 of the American Bar Association Model Rules of Professional Conduct. Some bar associations strongly enforce rules against ambulance chasing. For example, the State Bar of California dispatches investigators to large-scale disaster scenes to discourage ambulance chasers, and to catch any who attempt to solicit business from disaster victims at the scene.

In the UK, Indicative Behaviour (IB) 8.5 of the Solicitors Regulation Authority Code of Conduct 2011 specifies that "approaching people in the street, at ports of entry, in hospital or at the scene of an accident" is to be taken as an indication of non-compliance with the SRA Principles.

== Other uses ==
The term has also been used to refer to disreputable motorsport journalists who cover racing crashes in a tabloid journalism-style with little respect for those who may have been injured or killed.

In scientific literature, the term "ambulance chasing" refers to a socio-scientific phenomenon that manifests as a surge in the number of preprint papers on a particular topic. In particular, it refers to interpretive papers published quickly after a new anomalous measurement has been produced.

== See also ==
- NAACP v. Button (1963)
- In re Primus (1978)
