= Flagg Bros., Inc. v. Brooks =

- Supreme Court of the United States

Argued January 18, 1978 Decided May 15, 1978
- Full case name: Flagg Bros., Inc., et al. v. Brooks, et al.
- Citations: 436 U.S. 149 (more) 98 S. Ct. 1729; 56 L. Ed. 2d 185; 1978 U.S. LEXIS 90; 23 U.C.C. Rep. Serv. (Callaghan) 1105

Case history
- Prior: Defendants' motion to dismiss granted, 404 F. Supp. 1059 (S.D.N.Y. 1975); reversed, 553 F. 2d 764 (2d Cir. 1977); certiorari granted 434 U.S. 817 (1977)

Holding
- Sale of plaintiff's possessions by defendant garage, as authorized by New York's version of the Uniform Commercial Code, did not constitute state action, and thus did not create a federal due process claim under the Fourteenth Amendment.

Court membership
- Chief Justice Warren E. Burger Associate Justices William J. Brennan Jr. · Potter Stewart; Byron White · Thurgood Marshall; Harry Blackmun · Lewis F. Powell Jr. William Rehnquist · John P. Stevens

Case opinions
- Majority: Rehnquist, joined by Burger, Stewart, Blackmun, Powell
- Dissent: Marshall
- Dissent: Stevens, joined by White, Marshall
- Brennan took no part in the consideration or decision of the case.

Laws applied
- U.S. Const. amend. XIV; New York Uniform Commercial Code § 7-210

Flagg Bros., Inc. v. Brooks, 436 U.S. 149 (1978), was a case decided by the Supreme Court of the United States wherein the constitutionality of New York's Uniform Commercial Code provision, which allows a warehouse to enforce a lien upon repossessed goods by selling said goods, was challenged under the Fourteenth Amendment. The Court held that the state-allowed re-sale provision did not constitute state action, and thus, the plaintiff did not possess a colorable federal due process claim.

== Background ==
After the city evicted plaintiff/appellee Shirley Brooks from her home in Mount Vernon, N.Y. in 1973, her possessions were stored in a warehouse owned by American defendant/appellant corporation Flagg Bros., Inc. After several disputes between the parties regarding the price that Brooks was to pay for the moving and storage of her belongings, Flagg Bros. presented Brooks with notice that she needed to pay the amount owed within 10 days "or [her furniture would] be sold."

When letters from Brooks to the defendant did not produce any results, Brooks brought suit under 42 U.S.C. § 1983, seeking monetary damages, an injunction against the proposed sale, and a declaration by the judiciary that such a sale under New York Uniform Commercial Code § 7-210 would violate due process.

== Opinion of the Court ==
=== Rehnquist's majority opinion ===
Associate Justice William Rehnquist authored the majority opinion for the Court, joined by Chief Justice Warren Burger and Associate Justices Potter Stewart, Harry Blackmun, and Lewis Powell. Rehnquist began by outlining the dual burden that rested on the plaintiffs in making a viable Fourteenth Amendment claim. First, Rehnquist wrote, the plaintiffs must show that they have been deprived of a right guaranteed by the Constitution. Second, they must show that Flagg Bros. denied them of that right while acting under the color of New York state law.

However, Rehnquist wrote, Brooks carried an additional burden because she was accusing Flagg Bros. of depriving her of property under the Fourteenth Amendment. The Fourteenth Amendment reads, in part, that "[no] State [shall] deprive any person of life, liberty, or property, without due process of law." (emphasis added) Thus, according to the Court's Fourteenth Amendment jurisprudence, Flagg Bros. taking of Brooks' property could only rise to the level of a federal constitutional violation if Flagg Bros. was a state actor, that is, performing a duty traditionally and exclusively performed by the state, and therefore attributable to the state.

Pointing out that Brooks had failed to name any governmental entity as a defendant, Rehnquist went on to argue that "very few" functions have been exclusively carried out by state governments. In American history, the settlement of disputes between debtors and creditors was not, in Rehnquist's view, a function performed exclusively by the state, as the parties typically retained other avenues of remedy.

To Brooks' contention that the state had directly authorized the re-sale of her possessions under the UCC, Rehnquist responded that the UCC merely embodied the state's decision not to involve itself in the debtor-lendor dispute. If the state had failed to pass any law related to the re-sale, there could be no contention that the state had acted in any way. Codification of the state's intent to not involve its courts in the re-sale of repossessed goods still equated to a refusal to act.

=== Marshall's dissent ===
Associate Justice Thurgood Marshall authored a short dissenting opinion, emphasizing what he perceived as the Court's "attitude of callous indifference to the realities of life for the poor." Marshall observed that, according to the record before the Court, Brooks' takehome pay was $87 per week, and thus she would be unable to pay for the surety necessary, let alone the bill that she owed to the defendant. In Marshall's view, this meant that Brooks had no realistic remedy at state law. Further, Marshall argued that New York's state traditions led to the conclusion that the execution of liens was a state function, typically performed by the sheriff. Marshall also joined Justice Stevens' dissenting opinion.

=== Stevens' dissent ===
Associate Justice John Paul Stevens, joined by Associate Justices Marshall and Byron White, authored a dissent, arguing that the Court's decision was foreclosed by inconsistent prior caselaw including Sniadach v. Family Finance Corp. Stevens accused the Court of adopting an overly narrow definition of state action – arguing that under the Court's reasoning, a State could pass a law stating that it would authorize, for example, "any person of sufficient physical power" to seize and retain his neighbor's property.

Stevens noted the role of the state in defining and controlling the debtor-creditor relationship, seeing the state power in this case as the power to allow for a binding remedy against the wishes of one of the parties to the dispute.

== See also ==
- State actor
