= List of United States Supreme Court cases, volume 593 =

This is a list of all the United States Supreme Court cases from volume 593 of the United States Reports:

Note: As of December 2025, final bound volumes for the U.S. Supreme Court's United States Reports have been published through volume 585 (June 2018). Newer cases from subsequent future volumes do not yet have official page numbers and typically use three underscores in place of the page number; e.g., Example v. United States, 700 U.S. ___ (2050).

Case name	Docket no.	Date decided
Google LLC v. Oracle America, Inc.	18–956	April 5, 2021
Google's copying of the Java SE API, which included only those lines of code that were needed to allow programmers to put their accrued talents to work in a new and transformative program, was a fair use of that material as a matter of law.
Tandon v. Newsom	20A151	April 9, 2021
Government regulations are not neutral and generally applicable, and therefore trigger strict scrutiny under the Free Exercise Clause, whenever they treat any comparable secular activity more favorably than religious exercise.
AMG Capital Management, LLC v. FTC	19–508	April 22, 2021
Section 13(b) of the Federal Trade Commission Act does not authorize the Commission to seek or a court to award equitable monetary relief such as restitution or disgorgement.
Carr v. Saul	19–1442	April 22, 2021
A petitioner need not challenge the constitutionality of an agency's structure under the Appointments Clause in an internal agency administrative proceeding in order to present that challenge in court on appeal.
Jones v. Mississippi	18–1259	April 22, 2021
When a minor commits a homicide, neither Miller v. Alabama nor Montgomery v. Louisiana requires the sentencer to make a separate factual finding of "permanent incorrigibility" before sentencing the defendant to life without parole. In such a case, a discretionary sentencing system is both constitutionally necessary and constitutionally sufficient.
Alaska v. Wright	20–940	April 26, 2021
The requirement under AEDPA that a habeas petitioner be "in custody pursuant to the judgment of a State court" is not met if the state judgment is simply a necessary predicate to a federal conviction.
Niz-Chavez v. Garland	19–863	April 29, 2021
A notice to appear sufficient to trigger the IIRIRA's stop-time rule is a single document containing all the information about an individual's removal hearing specified in §1229(a)(1).
Caniglia v. Strom	20–157	May 17, 2021
There is no open-ended "community caretaking" exception to the Fourth Amendment's warrant requirement. Exigency must be shown.
CIC Services, LLC v. IRS	19–930	May 17, 2021
A suit to enjoin IRS Notice 2016–66 did not trigger the Anti-Injunction Act even though a violation of the notice may have resulted in a tax penalty.
BP p.l.c. v. Mayor and City Council of Baltimore	19–1189	May 17, 2021
The Fourth Circuit erred in holding that it lacked jurisdiction to consider all of the defendants’ grounds for removal under §1447(d).
Edwards v. Vannoy	19–5807	May 17, 2021
The Ramos v. Louisiana jury-unanimity rule does not apply retroactively on federal collateral review.
Guam v. United States	20–382	May 24, 2021
Superfund's Section 113(f)(3)(B) did not apply to the consent agreement that Guam made with the EPA, so the three-year statute of limitations from Section 113(f)(3)(B) did not apply.
United States v. Palomar-Santiago	20–437	May 24, 2021
All three requirements of 8 U.S.C. § 1326(d) are mandatory.
San Antonio v. Hotels.com, L. P.	20–334	May 27, 2021
Federal Rule of Appellate Procedure 39 does not permit a district court to alter a court of appeals’ allocation of the costs listed in subdivision (e) of that rule.
United States v. Cooley	19–1414	June 1, 2021
A tribal police officer may, with probable cause, detain and search non-Native people traveling on public roads through a reservation.
Garland v. Ming Dai	19–1155	June 1, 2021
The Ninth Circuit's rule that a reviewing court "must treat a noncitizen's testimony as credible and true absent an explicit adverse credibility determination" violated the Immigration and Nationality Act.
Van Buren v. United States	19–783	June 3, 2021
An individual "exceeds authorized access" when he accesses a computer with authorization but then obtains information located in particular areas of the computer—such as files, folders, or databases—that are off-limits to him.
Sanchez v. Mayorkas	20–315	June 7, 2021
A Temporary Protected Status (TPS) recipient who entered the United States unlawfully is not eligible under §1255 for lawful permanent resident status merely by dint of his TPS.
Borden v. United States	19–5410	June 10, 2021
A criminal offense with a mens rea of recklessness does not qualify as a "violent felony" under the Armed Career Criminal Act's elements clause.
Terry v. United States	20–5904	June 14, 2021
A crack offender is eligible for a sentence reduction under the First Step Act only if convicted of a crack offense that triggered a mandatory minimum sentence.
Greer v. United States	19–8709	June 14, 2021
An unobjected-to failure to instruct the jury that the defendant must have known they were a felon is not structural error requiring reversal. Moreover, it would be difficult to show plain error because "convicted felons ordinarily know that they are convicted felons."
Fulton v. City of Philadelphia	19–123	June 17, 2021
The refusal of Philadelphia to contract with CSS for the provision of foster care services unless CSS agrees to certify same-sex couples as foster parents violates the Free Exercise Clause of the First Amendment
Nestlé USA, Inc. v. Doe	19–416	June 17, 2021
Plaintiffs improperly sought extraterritorial application of the ATS given the presumption of domestic application and the fact that the conduct relevant to the statute's focus did not occur in the United States.
California v. Texas	19–840	June 17, 2021
Plaintiffs do not have standing to challenge §5000A(a)'s minimum essential coverage provision because they have not shown a past or future injury fairly traceable to defendants' conduct enforcing the specific statutory provision they attack as unconstitutional.

== See also ==
- List of United States Supreme Court cases by the Roberts Court
- 2020 term opinions of the Supreme Court of the United States
