= Garland v. Ming Dai =

- Supreme Court of the United States

Decided June 1, 2021
- Full case name: Garland v. Ming Dai
- Docket no.: 19-1155
- Citations: 593 U.S. ___ (more) 141 S. Ct. 1669

Holding
- The Ninth Circuit's rule that a reviewing court "must treat a noncitizen's testimony as credible and true absent an explicit adverse credibility determination" violated the Immigration and Nationality Act.

Court membership
- Chief Justice John Roberts Associate Justices Clarence Thomas · Stephen Breyer; Samuel Alito · Sonia Sotomayor; Elena Kagan · Neil Gorsuch; Brett Kavanaugh · Amy Coney Barrett

Case opinion
- Majority: Gorsuch, joined by unanimous

Laws applied
- Immigration and Nationality Act

Garland v. Ming Dai, 593 U.S. ___ (2021), was a United States Supreme Court case in which the Court held that the Ninth Circuit violated the Immigration and Nationality Act with its rule that a reviewing court "must treat a noncitizen's testimony as credible and true absent an explicit adverse credibility determination." When an immigration court rejects a noncitizen's testimony, the Act requires reviewing courts to uphold that rejection unless no reasonable factfinder could have agreed with the rejection. As long as the rejection was not completely arbitrary, the rejection must stand.
