= Michigan v. Tyler =

- Supreme Court of the United States

Argued January 10, 1978 Decided May 31, 1978
- Full case name: Michigan v. Tyler
- Citations: 436 U.S. 499 (more)
- Argument: Oral argument
- Opinion announcement: Opinion announcement

Holding
- Although firefighters and police can seize evidence of arson in plain view shortly after a fire, evidence of arson can not be seized by firefighters days after a fire without consent, a search warrant, or proof of abandonment.

Court membership
- Chief Justice Warren E. Burger Associate Justices William J. Brennan Jr. · Potter Stewart; Byron White · Thurgood Marshall; Harry Blackmun · Lewis F. Powell Jr. William Rehnquist · John P. Stevens

Case opinions
- Majority: Stewart, joined by Burger, Powell, White, Marshall (except IV-A), Blackmun (I, III, and IV-A)
- Concurrence: Stevens (I, III, and IV; in judgement)
- Dissent: Rehnquist
- Brennan took no part in the consideration or decision of the case.

Laws applied
- Fourth Amendment to the United States Constitution

Michigan v. Tyler, 436 U.S. 499 (1978), is a United States Supreme Court case in which the Court held that firefighters can not enter a burned premises (in this case, a furniture store) to retrieve evidence of arson barring a search warrant, evidence of exigent circumstances, evidence of abandonment, or consent.

== Dissent ==
Justice William Rehnquist argued that due to Tyler's actions, and business being unlikely to resume until major repairs are completed, the subsequent searches were reasonable under the circumstances.
