= 2020 term opinions of the Supreme Court of the United States =

October 2020 to October 2021 opinions

The 2020 term of the Supreme Court of the United States began October 5, 2020, and concluded October 3, 2021. The table below illustrates which opinion was filed by each justice in each case and which justices joined each opinion.

== Table key ==
Delivered the court's opinion

Joined the court's opinion

Filed a concurrence

Joined a concurrence

Filed a dissent

Joined a dissent

Filed a concurrence/dissent

Joined a concurrence/dissent

Filed a statement

Joined a statement

Did not participate in the decision
- Decisions that do not note an argument date were decided without oral argument. Decisions that do not note a justice delivering the court's opinion are per curiam.
- Multiple concurrences and dissents within a case are numbered, with joining votes numbered accordingly. Justices frequently join multiple opinions in a single case; each vote is subdivided accordingly.
- An asterisk ( * ) in the court's opinion denotes that it was only a majority in part or a plurality. An asterisk in a joining vote denotes that the justice joined it only in part.
- A dash ( - ) denotes that the justice voted without filing or joining an opinion.

== 2020 term opinions ==
#	Case name and citation	Argued	Decided	Roberts	Thomas	Breyer	Alito	Sotomayor	Kagan	Gorsuch	Kavanaugh	Barrett
1	Mckesson v. Doe, 592 U.S. 1		November 2, 2020		-							
2	Taylor v. Riojas, 592 U.S. 7		November 2, 2020		-							
3	Roman Catholic Diocese of Brooklyn v. Cuomo, 592 U.S. 14		November 25, 2020	1		2		2 / 3	2 / 3	1	2	
4	Tanzin v. Tanvir, 592 U.S. 43	October 6, 2020	December 10, 2020									
5	Carney v. Adams, 592 U.S. 53	October 5, 2020	December 10, 2020									
6	United States v. Briggs, 592 U.S. 69	October 13, 2020	December 10, 2020									
7	Rutledge v. Pharmaceutical Care Management Ass'n, 592 U.S. 80	October 6, 2020	December 10, 2020									
8	Texas v. New Mexico, 592 U.S. 98	October 5, 2020	December 14, 2020									
9	Shinn v. Kayer, 592 U.S. 111		December 14, 2020			-		-	-			
10	Trump v. New York, 592 U.S. 125	November 30, 2020	December 18, 2020									
11	Chicago v. Fulton, 592 U.S. 154	October 13, 2020	January 14, 2021									
12	Henry Schein, Inc. v. Archer & White Sales, Inc., 592 U.S. 168	December 8, 2020	January 25, 2021									
13	Federal Republic of Germany v. Philipp, 592 U.S. 169	December 7, 2020	February 3, 2021									
14	Salinas v. Railroad Retirement Bd., 592 U.S. 188	November 2, 2020	February 3, 2021									
15	Republic of Hungary v. Simon, 592 U.S. 207	December 7, 2020	February 3, 2021									
16	Brownback v. King, 592 U.S. 209	November 9, 2020	February 25, 2021									
17	Pereida v. Wilkinson, 592 U.S. 224	October 14, 2020	March 4, 2021									
18	United States Fish and Wildlife Serv. v. Sierra Club, Inc., 592 U.S. 261	November 2, 2020	March 4, 2021									
19	Uzuegbunam v. Preczewski, 592 U.S. 279	January 12, 2021	March 8, 2021									
20	Torres v. Madrid, 592 U.S. 306	October 14, 2020	March 25, 2021									
21	Ford Motor Co. v. Montana Eighth Judicial Dist., 592 U.S. 351	October 7, 2020	March 25, 2021		2		1			2		
22	Mays v. Hines, 592 U.S. 385		March 29, 2021					-				
23	Facebook, Inc. v. Duguid, 592 U.S. 395	December 8, 2020	April 1, 2021									
24	FCC v. Prometheus Radio Project, 592 U.S. 414	January 19, 2021	April 1, 2021									
25	Florida v. Georgia, 592 U.S. 433	February 22, 2021	April 1, 2021									
26	Google LLC v. Oracle America, Inc., 593 U.S. 1	October 7, 2020	April 5, 2021									
27	Tandon v. Newsom, 593 U.S. 61		April 9, 2021	-								
28	AMG Capital Management, LLC v. FTC, 593 U.S. 67	January 13, 2021	April 22, 2021									
29	Carr v. Saul, 593 U.S. 83	March 3, 2021	April 22, 2021		* / 1	* / 2				* / 1		* / 1
30	Jones v. Mississippi, 593 U.S. 98	November 3, 2020	April 22, 2021									
31	Alaska v. Wright, 593 U.S. 162		April 26, 2021									
32	Niz-Chavez v. Garland, 593 U.S. 155	November 9, 2020	April 29, 2021									
33	Caniglia v. Strom, 593 U.S. 194	March 24, 2021	May 17, 2021	1		1	2				3	
34	CIC Services, LLC v. Internal Revenue Service, 593 U.S. 209	December 1, 2020	May 17, 2021					1			2	
35	BP P.L.C. v. Mayor and City Council of Baltimore, 593 U.S. 230	January 19, 2021	May 17, 2021									
36	Edwards v. Vannoy, 593 U.S. 255	December 2, 2020	May 17, 2021		1 / 2					1 / 2		
37	Guam v. United States, 593 U.S. 310	April 26, 2021	May 24, 2021									
38	United States v. Palomar-Santiago, 593 U.S. 321	April 27, 2021	May 24, 2021									
39	San Antonio v. Hotels.com, L. P., 593 U.S. 330	April 21, 2021	May 27, 2021									
40	United States v. Cooley, 593 U.S. 345	March 23, 2021	June 1, 2021									
41	Garland v. Ming Dai, 593 U.S. 357	February 23, 2021	June 1, 2021									
42	Van Buren v. United States, 593 U.S. 374	November 30, 2020	June 3, 2021									
43	Sanchez v. Mayorkas, 593 U.S. 409	April 19, 2021	June 7, 2021									
44	Borden v. United States, 593 U.S. 420	November 3, 2020	June 10, 2021						*			
45	Terry v. United States, 593 U.S. 486	May 4, 2021	June 14, 2021									
46	Greer v. United States, 593 U.S. 503	April 20, 2021	June 14, 2021									
47	Fulton v. Philadelphia, 593 U.S. 522	November 4, 2020	June 17, 2021		2 / 3	1*	2 / 3			2 / 3	1	1
48	Nestlé USA, Inc. v. Doe, 593 U.S. 628	December 1, 2020	June 17, 2021	*	*	* / 2	1*	* / 2	* / 2	1	1*	*
49	California v. Texas, 593 U.S. 659	November 10, 2020	June 17, 2021									
50	United States v. Arthrex, Inc., 594 U.S. 1	March 1, 2021	June 21, 2021	*		2 / *		2 / *	2 / *	* / 1		
51	National Collegiate Athletic Assn. v. Alston, 594 U.S. 69	March 31, 2021	June 21, 2021									
52	Goldman Sachs Group, Inc. v. Arkansas Teacher Retirement System, 594 U.S. 113	March 29, 2021	June 21, 2021		* / 2		* / 2	* / 1		* / 2		
53	Cedar Point Nursery v. Hassid, 594 U.S. 139	March 22, 2021	June 23, 2021									
54	Mahanoy Area School Dist. v. B. L., 594 U.S. 180	April 28, 2021	June 23, 2021									
55	Collins v. Yellen, 594 U.S. 220	December 9, 2020	June 23, 2021		1	* / 3*		* / 3*	* / 3	* / 2		
56	Lange v. California, 594 U.S. 295	February 24, 2021	June 23, 2021	3	* / 2		3				1 / 2*	
57	Yellen v. Confederated Tribes of the Chehalis Reservation, 594 U.S. 338	April 19, 2021	June 25, 2021				*					
58	HollyFrontier Cheyenne Refining, LLC v. Renewable Fuels Assn., 594 U.S. 382	April 27, 2021	June 25, 2021									
59	TransUnion LLC v. Ramirez, 594 U.S. 413	March 30, 2021	June 25, 2021		1	1 / 2		1 / 2	1 / 2			
60	Lombardo v. St. Louis, 594 U.S. 464		June 28, 2021									
61	Pakdel v. City and County of San Francisco, 594 U.S. 474		June 28, 2021									
62	PennEast Pipeline Co. v. New Jersey, 594 U.S. 482	April 28, 2021	June 29, 2021		1 / 2				2	1 / 2		2
63	Johnson v. Guzman Chavez, 594 U.S. 523	January 11, 2021	June 29, 2021		*		*			*		
64	Minerva Surgical, Inc. v. Hologic, Inc., 594 U.S. 559	April 21, 2021	June 29, 2021		2		1			2		2
65	Americans for Prosperity Foundation v. Bonta, 594 U.S. 595	April 26, 2021	July 1, 2021	*	* / 1		* / 2			* / 2		
66	Brnovich v. Democratic National Committee, 594 U.S. 647	March 2, 2021	July 1, 2021									
67	Dunn v. Reeves, 594 U.S. 731		July 2, 2021			-						
68	Alabama Assn. of Realtors v. Department of Health and Human Servs., 594 U.S. 758		August 26, 2021									
#	Case name and citation	Argued	Decided	Roberts	Thomas	Breyer	Alito	Sotomayor	Kagan	Gorsuch	Kavanaugh	Barrett

== 2020 term membership and statistics ==
This was the sixteenth term of Chief Justice Roberts's tenure and the first term for Justice Barrett. The Court began its term with a vacant seat following the death of Justice Ruth Bader Ginsburg on September 18, 2020. The seat was filled by Amy Coney Barrett on October 26, 2020.

Justice		Appointment history		Agreement with judgment		Opinions filed				
Seniority	Name	President	Date confirmed	%	#					Total
Chief Justice	John Roberts	George W. Bush	September 29, 2005	91.2%	62/68	7	2	0	2	11
Associate Justice	Clarence Thomas	George H. W. Bush	October 15, 1991	79.4%	54/68	7	11	0	6	24
Associate Justice	Stephen Breyer	Bill Clinton	August 3, 1994	75%	51/68	6	1	1	7	15
Associate Justice	Samuel Alito	George W. Bush	January 31, 2006	82.1%	55/67	6	8	1	4	19
Associate Justice	Sonia Sotomayor	Barack Obama	August 6, 2009	67.6%	46/68	6	6	3	5	20
Associate Justice	Elena Kagan	Barack Obama	August 7, 2010	73.5%	50/68	6	1	0	4	11
Associate Justice	Neil Gorsuch	Donald Trump	April 7, 2017	86.8%	59/68	6	8	2	3	19
Associate Justice	Brett Kavanaugh	Donald Trump	October 6, 2018	97.1%	66/68	6	7	0	2	15
Associate Justice	Amy Coney Barrett	Donald Trump	October 26, 2020	91.1%	51/56	4	1	0	3	8
Notes on statistics: Opinion counts only include the bench opinions listed above; opinions relating to orders or in-chambers opinions are not included.; Agreement with the Court's judgment does not guarantee agreement with the reasoning expressed in its opinion. A justice is not considered in agreement if they dissented even in part. Agreement percentages are based only on the listed cases in which a justice participated and are rounded to the nearest one-tenth of one percentage point.						Totals				
Notes on statistics: Opinion counts only include the bench opinions listed above; opinions relating to orders or in-chambers opinions are not included.; Agreement with the Court's judgment does not guarantee agreement with the reasoning expressed in its opinion. A justice is not considered in agreement if they dissented even in part. Agreement percentages are based only on the listed cases in which a justice participated and are rounded to the nearest one-tenth of one percentage point.						54	45	7	36	142
