= List of United States Supreme Court cases, volume 594 =

This is a list of all the United States Supreme Court cases from volume 594 of the United States Reports:

Note: As of December 2025, final bound volumes for the U.S. Supreme Court's United States Reports have been published through volume 585 (June 2018). Newer cases from subsequent future volumes do not yet have official page numbers and typically use three underscores in place of the page number; e.g., Example v. United States, 700 U.S. ___ (2050).

Case name	Docket no.	Date decided
United States v. Arthrex, Inc.	19–1434	June 21, 2021
The unreviewable authority of Administrative Patent Judges is incompatible with their status as inferior officers. The Director of the Patent and Trademark Office, as their principal officer, may review such decisions and, upon review, may confirm or revise the decisions.
National Collegiate Athletic Association v. Alston	20–512	June 21, 2021
Upholding as consistent with antitrust principles an injunction that prohibited the enforcement of certain NCAA rules that limited education-related benefits for student-athletes.
Goldman Sachs Group, Inc. v. Arkansas Teacher Retirement System	20–222	June 21, 2021
Defendants bear the burden of persuasion to prove a lack of price impact by a preponderance of the evidence at class certification.
Cedar Point Nursery v. Hassid	20–107	June 23, 2021
The California Agricultural Labor Relations Act of 1975, which grants labor organizations an uncompensated "right to take access" to an agricultural employer’s property in order to solicit support for unionization, effects a per se physical taking under the Fifth Amendment.
Mahanoy Area School District v. B. L.	20–255	June 23, 2021
While public schools may have a special interest in regulating some off-campus student speech, the special interests offered by the school are not sufficient to overcome B. L.’s interest in free expression in this case.
Collins v. Yellen	19–422	June 23, 2021
1. The shareholders’ statutory claim must be dismissed. The "anti-injunction clause" of the Recovery Act provides that unless review is; specifically authorized by one of its provisions or is requested by the Director, "no court may take any action to restrain or affect the exercise of powers or functions of the Agency as a conservator or a receiver." 2. The Recovery Act’s restriction on the President’s power to remove the FHFA Director, 12 U.S.C. §4512(b)(2), is unconstitutional.
Lange v. California	20–18	June 23, 2021
Under the Fourth Amendment, pursuit of a fleeing misdemeanor suspect does not always or categorically qualify as an exigent circumstance justifying a warrantless entry into a home.
Yellen v. Confederated Tribes of the Chehalis Reservation	20–543	June 25, 2021
Alaska Native corporations are "Indian tribe[s]" under ISDA and thus eligible for funding under Title V of the CARES Act.
HollyFrontier Cheyenne Refining, LLC v. Renewable Fuels Assn.	20–472	June 25, 2021
A small refinery that previously received a hardship exemption may obtain an "extension" under §7545(o)(9)(B)(i) even if it saw a lapse in exemption coverage in a previous year.
TransUnion LLC v. Ramirez	20–297	June 25, 2021
Only plaintiffs concretely harmed by a defendant’s statutory violation have Article III standing to seek damages against that private defendant in federal court.
Lombardo v. St. Louis	20–391	June 28, 2021
The Supreme Court said it was unclear whether the Eighth Circuit incorrectly thought the use of a prone restraint is per se constitutional so long as an individual appears to resist officers' efforts to subdue him. The case was remanded to give the lower court the opportunity in the first instance to employ the context-specific analysis required by Supreme Court excessive-force precedent.
Pakdel v. City and County of San Francisco	20–1212	June 28, 2021
Plaintiffs do not need to perform administrative exhaustion of state remedies to file a Section 1983 takings claim when the state has reached a conclusive position.
PennEast Pipeline Co. v. New Jersey	19–1039	June 29, 2021
Section 717f(h) of the Natural Gas Act of 1938 authorizes FERC certificate holders to condemn all necessary rights-of-way, whether owned by private parties or States.
Johnson v. Guzman Chavez	19–897	June 29, 2021
Non-citizens subject to reinstated deportation orders are not entitled to bond hearings while seeking to prevent the deportation; their removal orders are "administratively final."
Minerva Surgical, Inc. v. Hologic, Inc.	20–440	June 29, 2021
Assignor estoppel is a recognized principle, however it only applies when a claim of invalidity is actually inconsistent with representations of the patents validity.
Americans for Prosperity Foundation v. Bonta	19–251	July 1, 2021
The requirement for non-profit organizations to disclose their donors under California law is facially invalid because it burdens the First Amendment rights of the donors and it is not also narrowly tailored to an important interest of government.
Brnovich v. Democratic National Committee	19–1257	July 1, 2021
Neither Arizona's out-of-precinct policy nor HB 2023 violate Section 2 of the Voting Rights Act of 1965 and HB 2023 was not enacted with a racially discriminatory purpose in mind.
Dunn v. Reeves	20–1084	July 2, 2021
Federal habeas courts must defer to reasonable state-court decisions. Moreover, the Alabama court's treatment of the spotty record in this case was consistent with the Supreme Court's recognition in Burt v. Titlow that "the absence of evidence cannot overcome the strong presumption that counsel's conduct fell within the wide range of reasonable professional assistance."
Alabama Assn. of Realtors v. Department of Health and Human Servs.	21A23	August 26, 2021
Denying a request by a group of Alabama real estate agents to block a federal moratorium on evictions that was imposed because of the COVID-19 pandemic.

== See also ==
- List of United States Supreme Court cases by the Roberts Court
- 2020 term opinions of the Supreme Court of the United States
