= Florida v. Georgia =

The U.S. states of Florida and Georgia have been parties to several original jurisdiction suits before the United States Supreme Court, captioned Florida v. Georgia.

- Florida v. Georgia (1855), dealing with the border between Florida and Georgia
- Florida v. Georgia (2018), dealing with water appropriation rights
- Florida v. Georgia (2021), dealing with the decision from the prior 2018 case
- Florida v. Georgia (1851), 52 U.S. 293
