= McKesson (disambiguation) =

The McKesson Corporation is a corporation specializing in the distribution of health care systems, medical supplies and pharmaceutical products.

McKesson may also refer to:

- The McKesson and Robbins scandal, a business and accounting scandal in the early 20th century involving a predecessor of the McKesson Corporation
- Mckesson v. Doe, a decision by the U.S. Supreme Court
- McKesson Information Solutions, Inc. v. Bridge Medical, Inc., a 2007 patent case on the doctrine of inequitable conduct
- McKesson Plaza, an office skyscraper located in San Francisco's Financial District
- Malcolm McKesson (1909–1999), American artist known for his ballpoint pen drawings and erotic fiction
- DeRay Mckesson (b. 1985), American civil rights activist
