= United States v. Briggs =

United States v. Briggs may refer to:

- United States v. Briggs (1847), in which the Supreme Court of the United States limited its jurisdiction to hear criminal certificates of division
- United States v. Briggs (2020), in which the Court held that the Uniform Code of Military Justice imposes no statute of limitations on rapes committed between 1986 and 2006
