= List of United States Supreme Court cases, volume 592 =

This is a list of all the United States Supreme Court cases from volume 592 of the United States Reports:

Note: As of December 2025, final bound volumes for the U.S. Supreme Court's United States Reports have been published through volume 585 (June 2018). Newer cases from subsequent future volumes do not yet have official page numbers and typically use three underscores in place of the page number; e.g., Example v. United States, 700 U.S. ___ (2050).

Case name	Docket no.	Date decided
Mckesson v. Doe	19–1108	November 2, 2020
Under the facts of this case, the state supreme court should resolve uncertain state tort law before federal courts decide whether applying that law would violate the First Amendment.
Taylor v. Riojas	19–1261	November 2, 2020
The officers were not entitled to qualified immunity; no reasonable correctional officer could have concluded that, under these extreme circumstances, it was constitutionally permissible to house Taylor in such deplorably unsanitary conditions for an extended period of time.
Roman Catholic Diocese of Brooklyn v. Cuomo	20A87	November 25, 2020
The stay applicants made a strong showing that the challenged restrictions violate "the minimum requirement of neutrality" to religion under Church of Lukumi Babalu Aye, Inc. v. Hialeah. The regulations limiting gatherings during the COVID lockdowns could not be viewed as neutral because they singled out houses of worship for more stringent restrictions.
Tanzin v. Tanvir	19–71	December 10, 2020
The express remedies provision under the Religious Freedom Restoration Act of 1993 permits litigants to obtain monetary damages against federal officials in their individual capacity whenever it is appropriate for such litigants to do so.
Carney v. Adams	19–309	December 10, 2020
Because Adams did not show that he was "able and ready" to apply for a judicial vacancy in the imminent future, he failed to show a "personal," "concrete" and "imminent" injury necessary for Article III standing.
United States v. Briggs	19–108	December 10, 2020
Capital crimes do not have a statute of limitations under the UCMJ, and rape is a capital crime under the UCMJ.
Rutledge v. Pharmaceutical Care Management Ass'n	18–540	December 10, 2020
State statutes are only preempted by ERISA if they have an "impermissible connection" to ERISA plans or they "refer to" ERISA plans.
Texas v. New Mexico	Orig./ 65, Orig.	December 14, 2020
New Mexico's motion for credit for the evaporated water was not untimely. New Mexico is entitled to delivery credit for the evaporated water.
Shinn v. Kayer	19–1302	December 14, 2020
Under AEDPA, when a state court has applied clearly established federal law to reasonably determined facts in the process of adjudicating a claim on the merits, a federal habeas court may not disturb the state court's decision unless its error lies "beyond any possibility for fairminded disagreement." In this case, the Court of Appeals erred in ordering issuance of a writ of habeas corpus despite ample room for reasonable disagreement about the prisoner's ineffective-assistance-of-counsel claim.
Trump v. New York	20–366	December 18, 2020
Case was premature due to lack of standing and ripeness.
Chicago v. Fulton	19–357	January 14, 2021
The mere retention of estate property after the filing of a bankruptcy petition does not violate 11 U.S.C. § 362(a)(3), which operates as a "stay" of "any act" to "exercise control" over the property of the estate.
Henry Schein, Inc. v. Archer & White Sales, Inc.	19–963	January 25, 2021
Dismissed as improvidently granted.
Federal Republic of Germany v. Philipp	19–351	February 3, 2021
The FSIA does not allow Holocaust survivors to sue Germany in U.S. court for the return of items stolen during that genocide, as the sale was an act of expropriation of property rather than an act of genocide.
Salinas v. Railroad Retirement Board	19–199	February 3, 2021
The United States Railroad Retirement Board's decision to refuse to reopen the prior, adverse benefits determination of a former railroad worker was subject to judicial review.
Republic of Hungary v. Simon	18–1447	February 3, 2021
Vacated and remanded for further proceedings consistent with Federal Republic of Germany v. Philipp.
Brownback v. King	19–546	February 25, 2021
A dismissal for failure to state a claim under the Federal Tort Claims Act is a judgement on the merits that triggers the FTCA's judgement bar on future actions.
Pereida v. Wilkinson	19–438	March 4, 2021
Under the Immigration and Nationality Act, certain nonpermanent residents seeking to cancel a lawful removal order bear the burden of showing they have not been convicted of a disqualifying offense.
United States Fish and Wildlife Serv. v. Sierra Club, Inc.	19–547	March 4, 2021
The deliberative process privilege protects from disclosure under FOIA in-house draft biological opinions that are both predecisional and deliberative, even if the drafts reflect the agencies' last views about a proposal.
Uzuegbunam v. Preczewski	19–968	March 8, 2021
A request for nominal damages satisfies the redressability element necessary for Article III standing where a plaintiff’s claim is based on a completed violation of a legal right.
Torres v. Madrid	19–292	March 25, 2021
The application of physical force to the body of a person with intent to restrain is a seizure even if the person does not submit and is not subdued.
Ford Motor Co. v. Montana Eighth Judicial Dist.	19–368	March 25, 2021
The connection between the plaintiffs’ claims and Ford’s activities in the forum States is close enough to support specific jurisdiction.
Mays v. Hines	20–507	March 29, 2021
The Sixth Circuit "disregarded the overwhelming evidence of guilt" that supported a Tennessee court's conviction of a man for murder. This approach violated Congress' prohibition in AEDPA of disturbing state-court judgments on federal habeas review absent an error that lies beyond any possibility for fair-minded disagreement.
Facebook v. Duguid	19–511	April 1, 2021
Whether the definition of automatic telephone dialing system in the Telephone Consumer Protection Act of 1991 encompasses any device that can "store" and "automatically dial" telephone numbers, even if the device does not "us[e] a random or sequential number generator".
FCC v. Prometheus Radio Project	19–1231	April 1, 2021
The FCC’s decision to repeal or modify the three ownership rules was not arbitrary and capricious for purposes of the APA
Florida v. Georgia	Orig./ 142, Orig.	April 1, 2021
Florida's exceptions to the Special Master's Report are overruled, and the case is dismissed.

== See also ==
- List of United States Supreme Court cases by the Roberts Court
- 2020 term opinions of the Supreme Court of the United States
