= Moral turpitude =

Legal concept

Moral turpitude is a legal concept in the United States, and until 1976 in Canada, that refers to "an act or behavior that gravely violates the sentiment or accepted standard of the community". This term appears in U.S. immigration law beginning in the 19th century. Moral turpitude laws typically deal with legal, judicial, and business-related transgressions. Moral turpitude laws should not be confused with laws regarding social morality, violations of which are more commonly called public order, morality, decency, and/or vice crimes.

The California Supreme Court described "moral turpitude" as an "act of baseness, vileness, or depravity in the private and social duties which a man owes to his fellowmen, or to society in general, contrary to the accepted and customary rule of right and duty between man and man."

The classification of a crime or other conduct as constituting moral turpitude has significance in several areas of law. First, a prior conviction of a crime of moral turpitude (or in some jurisdictions, "moral turpitude conduct", even without a conviction) is considered to have a bearing on the honesty of a witness and might be used for purposes of the impeachment of witnesses.

Second, offenses involving moral turpitude may be grounds to deny or revoke state professional licenses such as teaching credentials, applications for public notary, licenses to practice law, or other licensed professions. Further, it can be grounds to deny a security clearance required for sensitive government jobs, and a basis to deny employment in law enforcement capacities.

Third, the concept is relevant in contract law since employment contracts and sponsorship agreements often contain a moral turpitude clause, which allows the sponsor to terminate a contract without penalty if the employee or sponsored party commits an act of moral turpitude. What sort of acts constitute "moral turpitude" can vary greatly depending on the situation and the exact terms of the contract, but the clause is often invoked in cases involving clearly non-criminal behavior and/or allegations for which there is insufficient evidence for a conviction (assuming the alleged act is even a criminal offense).

Fourth, this concept is of great importance for immigration purposes in the United States, Canada (prior to 1976), and some other countries, since offenses defined as instances of moral turpitude are considered bars to immigration into the United States.

Fifth, some jurisdictions may deny or revoke liquor licenses or other similar licenses for moral turpitude.

Over time, U.S. law has diverged from historical and commonsense notions of moral turpitude. What was once a phrase alluding to grave, shameful immorality now covers a wide spectrum of felonies and misdemeanors in immigration and professional regulation. This evolution reflects policy choices as much as linguistic ones: Congress deliberately left the term undefined, trusting agencies and courts to interpret it (see Jordan v. De George, 341 U.S. 223, 229–30 (1951)). The result is vagueness and perceived overbreadth.

== American immigration law ==
A conviction for a crime involving moral turpitude (CIMT) causes a person to be inadmissible to the United States under section 212(a)(2)(a)(i) of the Immigration and Nationality Act (INA). There are petty offense exceptions to this rule, but these exceptions do not change the meaning of the question on the visa waiver program or on the visa application form, and cannot be self-certified. A controlled substance violation causes the alien to be inadmissible to the United States under section 212(a)(2)(i)(II) of the INA. They are two different sections of the law. A controlled substance violation is a CIMT. The immigration administrative proceeding does not use a controlled substance violation as a CIMT. A visa waiver program applicant admissibility is determined at the port of entry and they are subject to section 212(a) and 217 of the INA.

=== Visa Waiver Program ===
The second question on document I-94W for those visiting the U.S. on the Visa Waiver Program asks:

Have you ever been arrested or convicted for an offense or crime involving moral turpitude or a violation related to a controlled substance; or been arrested or convicted for two or more offenses for which the aggregate sentence to confinement was five years or more; or been controlled substance trafficker; or are you seeking entry to engage in criminal or immoral activities?

Little guidance is provided to the traveler as to which offenses are included in the definition. However, the Web site of the U.S. embassy in London states that:

Travelers who have been arrested, even if the arrest did not result in a criminal conviction, those with criminal records, (the Rehabilitation of Offenders Act does not apply to U.S. visa law), certain serious communicable illnesses, those who have been refused admission into, or have been deported from, the United States, or have previously overstayed on the VWP are not eligible to travel visa-free under the Visa Waiver Program.

This appears to be at variance with the question on form I-94W and information supplied by the U.S. Department of Homeland Security, as there are many offenses that are not considered to involve moral turpitude.

=== U.S. government guidance on determining moral turpitude ===
A definition of moral turpitude is available for immigration purposes from the Foreign Affairs Manual, available on the U.S. Department of State website. and the U.S. Government Publishing Office website (8 U.S.C. § 1251(a)(2)(A)(i)).

For offenses (or arrests on suspicion of such offenses) occurring outside the U.S., the locally defined offense must be considered against the U.S. definitions, and in such cases, it is the definition of the offense (as defined in the appropriate country) which is considered for immigration purposes, and not the circumstances of the individual's actual case.

Whether a state law offense constitutes a crime involving moral turpitude for federal immigration purposes is decided on a statute by statute basis, because each state statute might cover a different range of behaviors, some of which may not necessarily involve moral turpitude under the Federal definition. For an example of a criminal statute that seems like it would categorically involve moral turpitude, but actually does not because the statute covers some behavior that does not involve moral turpitude, see the Ninth Circuit case Castrijon-Garcia v. Holder, No. 09-73756 (9th Cir. 2013) (simple kidnapping under California Penal Code § 207(a) is not a categorical crime involving moral turpitude). From Pereida v. Wilkinson (2021), the onus is on the immigrant to show that a crime is not one of moral turpitude if they are seeking action under immigration policies.

Category	Crimes involving moral turpitude	Crimes not involving moral turpitude
Crimes Against Property	Fraud: Making false representation; Knowledge of such false representation by the perpetrator; Reliance on the false representation by the person defrauded; An intent to defraud; The actual act of committing fraud; Evil intent: Arson; Blackmail; Burglary; Embezzlement; Extortion; False pretenses; Forgery; Larceny (grand or petty); Malicious destruction of property; Knowingly receiving stolen goods; Robbery; Theft (when it involves the intention of permanent taking); Transporting stolen property (with guilty knowledge)	Damaging private property (where intent to damage not required); Breaking and entering (requiring no specific or implicit intent to commit a crime involving moral turpitude); Passing bad checks (where intent to defraud not required); Possessing stolen property (if guilty knowledge is not essential); Joy riding (where the intention to take permanently not required); Juvenile delinquency; Trespassing
Crimes Committed Against Governmental Authority	Bribery; Counterfeiting; Fraud against revenue or other government functions; Mail and wire fraud; Perjury; Harboring a fugitive from justice (with guilty knowledge); Tax evasion (willful)	Black market violations; Breach of the peace; Carrying a concealed weapon; Desertion from the Armed Forces; Disorderly conduct; Drunk or reckless driving; Driving while license suspended or revoked; Driving without insurance; Drunkenness; Escape from prison; Failure to report for military induction; False statements (not amounting to perjury or involving fraud); Firearm violations; Gambling violations; Immigration violations; Liquor violations; Loan sharking; Lottery violations; Minor traffic violations; Operating a pirate radio or television station; Possessing burglar tools (without intent to commit burglary); Smuggling and customs violations (where intent to commit fraud is absent); Tax evasion (without intent to defraud); Unauthorized practice of law; Vagrancy
Crimes Committed Against Person, Family Relationship, and Sexual Morality	Abandonment of a minor child (if willful and resulting in the destitution of the child); Adultery (see INA 101** repealed by Public Law 97-116); Assault (this crime is broken down into several categories, which involve moral turpitude): Assault with intent to kill, commit rape, commit robbery or commit serious bodily harm; Assault with a dangerous or deadly weapon; Bigamy; Paternity fraud; Contributing to the delinquency of a minor (where sexual); Gross indecency; Incest (if the result of an improper sexual relationship); Kidnapping; Lewdness; Manslaughter: Voluntary; Involuntary (where the statute requires proof of recklessness, which is defined as the awareness and conscious disregard of a substantial and unjustified risk which constitutes a gross deviation from the standard that a reasonable person would observe in the situation. A conviction for the statutory offense of vehicular homicide or other involuntary manslaughter requires only a showing of negligence will not involve moral turpitude even if it appears the defendant in fact acted recklessly); Mayhem; Murder; Pandering; Prostitution; Rape (including "Statutory rape" by virtue of the victim's age)	Assault (simple) (any assault, which does not require an evil intent or depraved motive, although it may involve the use of a weapon, which is neither dangerous nor deadly); Bastardy (the offense of begetting a bastard child); Creating or maintaining a nuisance (where knowledge that premises were used for prostitution is not necessary); Incest (when a result of a marital status prohibited by law); Involuntary manslaughter (when killing is not the result of recklessness); Libel; Failure to register as a sex offender; Mailing an obscene letter; Mann Act violations (where coercion is not present); Riot; Sexual harassment; Suicide (attempted or successful)
Attempts, Aiding and Abetting, Accessories and Conspiracy	An attempt to commit a crime deemed to involve moral turpitude; Aiding and abetting in the commission of a crime deemed to involve moral turpitude; Being an accessory (before or after the fact) in the commission of a crime deemed to involve moral turpitude; Taking part in a conspiracy (or attempting to take part in a conspiracy) to commit a crime involving moral turpitude where the attempted crime would itself constitute moral turpitude.	N/A
From the United States Department of State Foreign Affairs Manual

== American Bar and DUI ==
An arrest or conviction for a Driving Under the Influence is not necessarily a reason to deny entry to law school or the bar. However, honesty during applications to law school or to sit for the bar is important since it speaks to the character of the applicant. In the eyes of many admissions committees, covering up a past criminal activity is a more serious offense than the crime itself.

While every state is different, most states treat repeat issues involving substance use as evidence of moral turpitude. Substance use, in general, is a serious problem within the legal profession, and substance use affects lawyers at nearly twice the rate of the general population.

In 2011, the Georgia Supreme Court refused to allow two law school graduates to take the state bar exam, partly because they did not reveal their entire criminal histories on their law school applications. John Payne, 57, disclosed all of his criminal history to the state bar, but he did not tell Southern Illinois University about some of his drunken driving history. He had six DUI convictions, as well as other felony and misdemeanor convictions, spanning from his youth to his mid-40s. Roy Yunker Jr., 40, failed to disclose the various DUI offenses to both John Marshall Law School, where he earned his J.D., and to the Georgia State Bar.

== American state voting laws ==
Some US states, including Georgia and Alabama, have or had laws on the books preventing convicted felons from voting if their crime involved moral turpitude. In at least one case, such a law was struck down by the US Supreme Court as having its roots in Reconstruction era white supremacy. However, voting laws involving moral turpitude remain on the books in both Georgia and Alabama. The definition of moral turpitude has varied in different states and at different times. In Georgia, all felonies are considered to be crimes involving moral turpitude. In Alabama, this was also formerly the case, but in 2017 the restriction was relaxed sufficiently that some felonies, such as drug possession, are no longer considered to involve moral turpitude.

== See also ==
- Fit-and-proper-person test
- Good moral character
- Nemo auditur propriam turpitudinem allegans
- Malum in se
