= Deliberative process privilege =

Principle in common law

Deliberative process privilege is the common-law principle that the internal processes of the executive branch of a government are immune from normal disclosure or discovery in civil litigations, Freedom of Information Act requests, etc.

The theory behind the protection is that by guaranteeing confidentiality, the government will receive better or more candid advice, recommendations and opinions, resulting in better decisions for society as a whole. The deliberative process privilege is often in dynamic tension with the principle of maximal transparency in government.

== US ==
In the context of the US presidential offices and their work products, this principle is a form of executive privilege, or as a type of executive privilege that is distinct from "presidential communications privilege".

The US FOIA has a specific exemption (Exemption 5) for deliberative process documents. The scope of Exemption 5 was clarified by SCOTUS in United States v. Sierra Club, Inc (2021).

== See also ==
- Public-interest immunity
