= Egelhoff v. Egelhoff =

- Supreme Court of the United States

Argued November 8, 2000 Decided March 21, 2001
- Full case name: Donna Rae Egelhoff, Petitioner v. Samantha Egelhoff, A Minor, By and Through Her Natural Parent Kate Breiner, and David Egelhoff
- Citations: 532 U.S. 141 (more) 121 S. Ct. 1322; 149 L. Ed. 2d 264; 2001 U.S. LEXIS 2458; 69 U.S.L.W. 4206; 25 Employee Benefits Cas. (BNA) 2089; 2001 Daily Journal DAR 2861; 2001 Colo. J. C.A.R. 1477; 14 Fla. L. Weekly Fed. S 147

Holding
- State statutes having a connection with ERISA plans are superseded by ERISA.

Court membership
- Chief Justice William Rehnquist Associate Justices John P. Stevens · Sandra Day O'Connor; Antonin Scalia · Anthony Kennedy; David Souter · Clarence Thomas; Ruth Bader Ginsburg · Stephen Breyer

Case opinions
- Majority: Thomas, joined by Rehnquist, O'Connor, Scalia, Kennedy, Souter, Ginsburg
- Concurrence: Scalia, joined by Ginsburg
- Dissent: Breyer, joined by Stevens

Laws applied
- Employee Retirement Income Security Act of 1974 (ERISA), 29 U.S.C. § 1001 et seq.

Egelhoff v. Egelhoff, 532 U.S. 141 (2001), is a United States Supreme Court decision addressing federal preemption of state law under the Employee Retirement Income Security Act of 1974 (ERISA). The Court held that state statutes having a ‘connection with’ ERISA-governed benefit plans are preempted by ERISA.

The ruling reaffirmed that federal law may, in certain circumstances, supersede conflicting state regulations.

== Background ==
Washington resident David A. Egelhoff was married to Donna Rae Egelhoff, and during that time he designated her as the beneficiary of a life insurance policy and pension plan provided by his employer, The Boeing Company. Both benefits were governed by the federal Employee Retirement Income Security Act of 1974 (ERISA). David Egelhoff subsequently divorced his wife, but did not immediately remove her as a beneficiary. Several weeks after the divorce was finalized, David Egelhoff died in a car accident. Egelhoff’s children from a previous marriage sued Donna Rae Egelhoff to claim the life insurance and pension benefits. Under Washington law, a divorce automatically revokes a spouse’s designation as beneficiary of a nonprobate asset, such as a life insurance policy or employee benefit plan. However, ERISA contained no comparable revocation provision, meaning Donna Rae Egelhoff remained the named beneficiary.

The trial court held that ERISA preempted the Washington statute and awarded the benefits to Donna Rae Egelhoff. The Washington Court of Appeals reversed this decision, claiming that the federal law did not supersede state law. The Supreme Court of Washington affirmed the appeals court, concluding state statute neither "referred to" nor had a sufficient "connection with" an ERISA plan to trigger preemption. The Supreme Court granted certiorari.

== Decision ==
The Supreme Court overturned the Washington Supreme Court's decision, holding that the Washington statute had a "connection with" ERISA plans and was therefore preempted. According to the decision, the Court considered both "ERISA’s objectives as a guide to the scope of the state law that Congress understood would survive" and "the nature of the state law’s effect on ERISA plans" in its ruling.

The majority also found that Washington’s statute "interfere[d] with nationally uniform plan administration." The Court argued such state laws were the type of inconsistencies ERISA was designed to prevent and that allowing them would undermine uniform enforcement of federal benefit plan rules.

== See also ==
- Rutledge v. Pharmaceutical Care Management Ass'n
