= Trump v. New York =

2020 Supreme Court decision on the census

- Supreme Court of the United States

Argued November 30, 2020 Decided December 18, 2020
- Full case name: Donald J. Trump, President of the United States, et al. v. State of New York et al.
- Docket no.: 20-366
- Citations: 592 U.S. 125 (more)
- Argument: Oral argument

Holding
- Case was premature due to lack of standing and ripeness.

Court membership
- Chief Justice John Roberts Associate Justices Clarence Thomas · Stephen Breyer; Samuel Alito · Sonia Sotomayor; Elena Kagan · Neil Gorsuch; Brett Kavanaugh · Amy Coney Barrett

Case opinions
- Per curiam
- Dissent: Breyer, joined by Sotomayor, Kagan

Trump v. New York, 592 U.S. 125 (2020), was a United States Supreme Court case dealing with the 2020 United States census. It centered on the validity of a July 2020 executive memorandum from President Donald Trump to the Department of Commerce, which conducts and reports the census. The memo ordered the department to report the estimated counts of illegal immigrants in each state, allowing the president to exclude them for purposes of congressional apportionment. The memo was challenged by a coalition of U.S. states led by New York along with several cities and other organizations suing to block action on the memo. The United States District Court for the Southern District of New York found for the states and blocked enforcement of the memo, leading Trump to seek emergency relief asking the Supreme Court to rule on the matter before the results of the census were due on December 31, 2020. The Court issued a per curiam decision on December 18, 2020, vacating the District Court's ruling and dismissing the case because lack of standing and ripeness made the case premature. The same decision was reached by the court on December 18, 2020, for the similar Trump v. Useche case.

While multiple states vowed to bring the case back to the Supreme Court immediately after the required census results were reported, thereby establishing standing and ripeness, the Trump Administration struggled immensely with implementation (due in part to the Supreme Court case Department of Commerce v. New York). Ultimately, Trump's successor after the 2020 election, Joe Biden, issued Executive Order 13986 which required non-citizens to be counted in the 2020 Census, both for the purposes of enumeration and determining congressional apportionment, thereby reversing the order issued by the Trump administration and ending the controversy.

== Background ==
Article One, section 2, clause 3 of the United States Constitution directs the population be enumerated at least once every ten years and the resulting counts used to set the number of members from each state in the House of Representatives and, by extension, in the Electoral College.

During the debates surrounding the Fourteenth Amendment to the United States Constitution, "many members of Congress urged that only citizens or voters should be counted in determining congressional representation, insisting that foreigners who had arrived in America should not count for purposes of apportioning representatives to Congress." After seven months of debate, this language was not adopted.

The 2020 census is considered to have become a highly politicized event under President Trump. Trump ran on a platform to reduce the number of illegal immigrants in the United States. As preparations for the census approached, the Department of Commerce, which manages the United States Census Bureau, announced its intention to reintroduce a question on the census asking about one's immigration status within the census's "short form" which would be sent to all households. The department's intentions of this question were unclear, and many states, cities, and advocacy groups feared the question would lead some immigrants, including those with legal status in the country, to not answer the census, undercounting populations and affecting government representation and federal funding over the next decade. These states and other groups sued, and in the Supreme Court case Department of Commerce v. New York, the Court ruled in June 2019 that the rationale provided by the Commerce Department was arbitrary and capricious, and forbid the department from including the question unless they could provide a better explanation. The department opted not to include the question on the final forms that went out.

Following the Supreme Court's decision, Trump stated he still planned to use other means to estimate the number of undocumented immigrants as part of the census report. On July 21, 2020, he signed a memo to the Department of Commerce, "Memorandum On Excluding Illegal Aliens From the Apportionment Base Following the 2020 Census". The order instructed the department to exclude the estimated number of undocumented immigrants (those not covered by the Immigration and Nationality Act of 1965) from the totals when they submit their report documenting the census results by December 31, 2020. The administration argued that the apportionment clause of Article One of the Constitution does not define which "persons must be included in the apportionment base" for the census count. Since the census has normally excluded immigrants that have only temporarily been in the country such as diplomats, the administration argued this gave Trump the freedom to exclude these undocumented immigrants.

At least three separate legal challenges against the memo were filed within the week of the memo's signing. One case was filed by Common Cause in the United States District Court for the District of Columbia. Two others were filed in United States District Court for the Southern District of New York; one by a coalition of 22 states, the District of Columbia, 15 cities, and the United States Conference of Mayors, and another filed the American Civil Liberties Union and New York Civil Liberties Union. All three suits generally argued that the interpretation of "persons" from the Constitution as argued by the administration was gravely flawed given past case history and how the census has historically been conducted, and that the memo represented another arbitrary and capricious rulemaking decision. Analysis by the Pew Research Center based on population trends estimated that at least four states, California, Texas, Florida, and Arizona, could lose a Representative should illegal immigrants be discounted in the census total, while Montana would be set to gain a seat.

The two cases in the Southern District of New York were combined, and its ruling was issued on September 10, 2020, blocking enforcement of the memo. The three-judge panel ruled that while the President has some discretion of how the census results are reported, the authority to deviate from the Constitution statute, requiring "a statement showing the whole number of persons in each State", can only be set forth by Congress, and thus the memo exceeds the authority that the President has been given by Congress, ruling it invalid.

== Supreme Court ==
Trump petitioned the Supreme Court for an expedited hearing given the nearness of the December 31 deadline following the District Court's ruling. The petition asks to challenge the standing of the states and cities to be able to take legal action against the memo, as well as to affirm the administration's interpretation of "persons" in the apportionment clause. The Supreme Court agreed on October 16, 2020, to hear the case, and it held oral arguments on November 30, 2020. Observers to the hearing said that the Court, including its conservative members, appeared to doubt the claims that the President could alter who was counted via the census, but as there was yet no census data to review, the Justices also appeared uncertain how to proceed. The court observers believed that the Justices were likely not to act quickly to stop the order and may wait for the results to be collected and how that could impact federal representation to judge how to handle the case.

The Court issued a per curiam decision on December 18, 2020, which vacated the District Court's ruling and remanded the case to that court with orders to dismiss it. The opinion stated that there were issues with both standing and ripeness to the case that made it premature. The Court stated they did not consider the constitutional merits of the case: "Consistent with our determination that standing has not been shown and that the case is not ripe, we express no view on the merits of the constitutional and related statutory claims presented. We hold only that they are not suitable for adjudication at this time."

Justice Stephen Breyer wrote a dissent, which was joined by Justices Sonia Sotomayor and Elena Kagan. Breyer's dissent stated that the Court should have considered the case to evaluate the Executive Order since it was aimed to discount people from the census count.
