= Uzuegbunam v. Preczewski =

- Supreme Court of the United States

Argued January 12, 2021 Decided March 8, 2021
- Full case name: Chike Uzuegbunam, et al., v. Stanley C. Preczewski, et al.
- Docket no.: 19-968
- Citations: 592 U.S. 279 (more)
- Argument: Oral argument
- Decision: Opinion

Case history
- Prior: Motion to dismiss granted, Uzuegbunam v. Preczewski, 378 F. Supp. 3d 1195 (N.D. Ga. 2018); Affirmed, 781 F. App'x 824 (11th Cir. 2019); Cert. granted, 141 S. Ct. 195 (2020)

Holding
- A request for nominal damages satisfies the redressability element necessary for Article III standing where a plaintiff’s claim is based on a completed violation of a legal right.

Court membership
- Chief Justice John Roberts Associate Justices Clarence Thomas · Stephen Breyer; Samuel Alito · Sonia Sotomayor; Elena Kagan · Neil Gorsuch; Brett Kavanaugh · Amy Coney Barrett

Case opinions
- Majority: Thomas, joined by Breyer, Alito, Sotomayor, Kagan, Gorsuch, Kavanaugh, Barrett
- Concurrence: Kavanaugh
- Dissent: Roberts

Uzuegbunam v. Preczewski, 592 U.S. 279 (2021), is a decision by the Supreme Court of the United States, dealing with nominal damages to be awarded to individuals whose right to freedom of speech has been suppressed by an entity but subsequently rendered moot due to intervening circumstances. In an 8–1 decision, the Court held that such nominal damages satisfy the Article Three requirement of redressability, when awarded for a past violation of a legal rights.

Clarence Thomas wrote for the majority that Uzuegbunam's inability to quantify his damages in economic terms did not bar him from demanding nominal damages. Chief Justice John Roberts, dissenting alone for the only time so far in his tenure on the Court, argued that the majority had opened up the federal courts to litigation by anyone willing to claim so much as one dollar in nominal damages.

== Background ==
Chike Uzuegbunam was a student at Georgia Gwinnett College in Lawrenceville, Georgia. While at school, he adopted Christianity, and attempted to proselytize on campus. He was stopped by campus security and told that religious recruitment or proselytizing was limited to certain designated "speech zones" on campus, for use of which he was required to register ahead of time. Uzuegbunam followed the procedure to register a block of time at one of these zones, but due to a student complaint his activities were determined to be violating the policy that disallows speech that "disturbs the peace and/or comfort" of the students or faculty. Uzuegbunam made no further attempts to proselytize, and eventually graduated from the college.

The Alliance Defending Freedom (ADF) filed a lawsuit against the school on behalf of Uzuegbunam in the United States District Court for the Northern District of Georgia in December 2016. Shortly after the filing of the suit, the college changed its policies on its speech zones, which rendered Uzuegbunam's claims moot, since the activities he had attempted to pursue were no longer regulated and, in any event, he had since graduated and was no longer associated with the college. ADF countered with an assertion that the college should still be liable for nominal damages as it had violated Uzuegbunam's rights at some point in the past. Such nominal damages, typically a single dollar, are generally assigned to assert that wrongdoing had occurred as part of case law.

While the case was being heard in District Court, its appellate court, the Eleventh Circuit, ruled in Flanigan's Enters., Inc. v. City of Sandy Springs that "a claim for nominal damages in a constitutional violation case when the conduct is not likely to reoccur is moot". The District Court applied the Eleventh's Flanigan's ruling to Uzuegbunam's ruling and declared that the request for nominal damages was moot. The appeal of Uzuegbunam's case to the Eleventh Circuit upheld the mootness decision.

The Eleventh Circuit court's ruling in Flanigan's had furthered a split in the Circuit courts on the matter of nominal damages resulting from constitutional violations declared moot. In the 2nd, 4th, 5th, 6th, 8th, 9th and 10th Circuits, prior case law has deemed that even in the case of a moot violation, nominal damages are sufficient to keep a case alive. Legal experts had expected Flanigan's to be taken by the Supreme Court to resolve the circuit split, but the petition was rejected in 2018.

== Supreme Court ==
The ADF petitioned the US Supreme Court to hear Uzuegbunam's case on the basis that the split created by the Eleventh Circuit still remained unresolved. The Supreme Court granted certiorari in October 2020. Oral arguments were held on January 12, 2021. Observers said the Justices appeared to side with Uzuegbunam's argument, citing the use of nominal damages that singer-songwriter Taylor Swift had sought for and was awarded in a 2017 countersuit made against a Denver radio show host that Swift said had groped her; Justice Elena Kagan stated that Swift sought nominal damages in her case as, as Kagan described in Swift's mindset: "I just want a dollar, and that dollar is going to represent something both to me and to the world of women who have experienced what I've experienced.", with the same principle applying to Uzuegbunam's case.

The Court issued its ruling on March 8, 2021. In an 8–1 decision, the Court reversed the Eleventh Circuit's ruling and remanded the case for further review. Justice Clarence Thomas wrote the majority opinion joined by all but Chief Justice John Roberts. Thomas wrote that Uzuegbunam had experienced a violation of his rights, even if the situation was now moot, and "Because 'every violation [of a right] imports damage,' nominal damages can redress Uzuegbunam’s injury even if he cannot or chooses not to quantify that harm in economic terms." Justice Brett Kavanaugh wrote a concurring opinion.

Roberts wrote a dissenting opinion, marking the first time in his entire tenure that he had authored a solo dissenting opinion. In his opinion, Roberts argued that because the case was moot, the courts had no reason to continue to keep the case alive through the awarding of nominal damages, and said that the majority opinion created a "major expansion" of the courts' role.
