= Salinas v. Railroad Retirement Board =

- Supreme Court of the United States

Argued November 2, 2020 Decided February 3, 2021
- Full case name: Salinas v. Railroad Retirement Board
- Docket no.: 19-199
- Citations: 592 U.S. ___ (more)

Holding
- The United States Railroad Retirement Board's decision to refuse to reopen the prior, adverse benefits determination of a former railroad worker was subject to judicial review.

Court membership
- Chief Justice John Roberts Associate Justices Clarence Thomas · Stephen Breyer; Samuel Alito · Sonia Sotomayor; Elena Kagan · Neil Gorsuch; Brett Kavanaugh · Amy Coney Barrett

Case opinions
- Majority: Sotomayor, joined by Roberts, Breyer, Kagan, Kavanaugh
- Dissent: Thomas, joined by Alito, Gorsuch, Barrett

Laws applied
- Railroad Retirement Act

Salinas v. Railroad Retirement Board, 592 U.S. ___ (2021), was a United States Supreme Court case in which the court held that the United States Railroad Retirement Board's decision to refuse to reopen the prior, adverse benefits determination of a former railroad worker was subject to judicial review.

== Facts and procedural history ==
Manfredo M. Salinas was an employee of the Union Pacific Railroad for a fifteen-year period and was injured twice while working. In 1992, due to his injuries, Salinas began the process of seeking disability benefits provided under the Railroad Retirement Act of 1974. His application was denied three times, the final denial occurring in 2006. Salinas was granted benefits after a fourth application in 2013. After the board granted Salinas benefits, he appealed for reconsideration of the "amount and start date" of the benefits.

This reconsideration was denied. In response, Salinas appealed, arguing that the final denied application should be reopened, as the Railroad Retirement Board had not been given access to pertinent medical records in 2006. A Board hearing officer determined that the 2006 application could not be reopened as the Board’s standard four-year window for reopening had closed. After this determination, Salinas asked the U.S. Court of Appeals to review the decision. The Fifth Circuit dismissed Salinas’ petition, citing lack of jurisdiction.

== Supreme Court ==
In a 5–4 ruling, The Supreme Court reversed the Fifth Circuit's decision. The Supreme Court held that the Board's choice not to reopen the prior benefits review was subject to judicial review.
