= United States v. Arthrex, Inc. =

- Supreme Court of the United States

Argued March 1, 2021 Decided June 21, 2021
- Full case name: United States v. Arthrex, Inc., et al.; Smith & Nephew, Inc., et al. v. Arthrex, Inc., et al.; Arthrex, Inc. v. Smith & Nephew, Inc., et al.
- Docket nos.: 19-1434; 19-1452; 19-1458
- Citations: 594 U.S. ___ (more)

Holding
- The unreviewable authority of Administrative Patent Judges is incompatible with their status as inferior officers. The Director of the Patent and Trademark Office, as their principal officer, may review such decisions and, upon review, may confirm or revise the decisions.

Court membership
- Chief Justice John Roberts Associate Justices Clarence Thomas · Stephen Breyer; Samuel Alito · Sonia Sotomayor; Elena Kagan · Neil Gorsuch; Brett Kavanaugh · Amy Coney Barrett

Case opinions
- Majority: Roberts (Parts I and II), joined by Alito, Gorsuch, Kavanaugh, Barrett
- Plurality: Roberts (Part III), joined by Alito, Kavanaugh, Barrett
- Concur/dissent: Gorsuch
- Concur/dissent: Breyer, joined by Sotomayor, Kagan
- Dissent: Thomas, joined by Breyer, Sotomayor, Kagan (Parts I and II)

United States v. Arthrex, Inc., 594 U.S. 1 (2021), was a United States Supreme Court case related to the Appointments Clause of the United States Constitution as it related to patent judges on the Patent Trial and Appeal Board (PTAB). In a complex decision, the Court ruled that these judges were considered "principal officers" under the Appointments Clause, normally subject to appointment through the US president and the US Senate, but to remedy the matter, the Court ruled that the constitutional issue is resolved by allowing the PTAB decisions to be subject to review by the appropriately-appointed Director of the Patent Office.

== Background ==
The Leahy-Smith America Invents Act was passed by Congress in 2012 that significantly overhauled the United States patent system. Among features of the law, it enabled a new inter partes review of patents that could be initiated by nearly any member of the public. As this potentially would create more litigation within the United States Patent and Trademark Office, itself a division of the Department of Commerce, the Act established the Patent Trial and Appeal Board (PTAB) which included administrative patent judges (APJs) appointed through the Commerce Secretary. An inter partes review of a patent is presented to three of the PTAB judges who make a final decision to keep or invalidate some or all claims of the patent. Any further challenge beyond this proceeds to the United States Court of Appeals for the Federal Circuit.

In the specific case, Arthrex, Inc., a manufacturer of medical devices, had previously received a patent for a surgical device. They entered into a patent dispute with Smith & Nephew, Inc. and ArthroCare Corp., claiming the latter groups were infringing on their patent. The case moved into the PTAB, which found that Arthrex's patent was invalid. Arthrex appealed to the Federal Circuit, raising a question related to the constitutionality of the administrative judges on the PTAB. They argued that under the Appointments Clause, since the APJs were considered principal officers of the patent office, they were required to be appointed through the President and confirmed by the Senate. The Federal Circuit judges agreed with Arthrex's position, vacated the PTAB's ruling, ruled that the APJs' tenure must be changed to reflex this stance, and remanded the case back to the PTAB for a rehearing.

== Supreme Court ==
Arthrex, Smith & Nephew, and the government all petitioned to the Supreme Court for review of the Federal Circuit's decision. While Smith & Nephew and the government sought to challenge the general finding of the Federal Circuit, Arthrex was not satisfied that the Circuit's remedy related to the changes in tenure resolved the constitutionality problem, believing this was a matter that Congress was required to solve. The Court granted certiorari in October 2020. Oral arguments were held on March 1, 2021.

The Court's decision was issued on June 21, 2021. The Supreme Court, by a 5–4 vote, vacated the Federal Circuit's ruling and remanded the case for review. The majority opinion, written by Chief Justice John Roberts and joined by Justices Samuel Alito, Neil Gorsuch, Brett Kavanaugh, and Amy Coney Barrett, found the APJs were principal officers with "unreviewable authority" under the Appointments Clause, and thus their appointment outside of the President and Senate was unconstitutional. Roberts wrote "The unreviewable executive power exercised [...] is incompatible with their status as inferior officers. Only an officer properly appointed to a principal office may issue a final decision binding the executive branch in the proceeding before us."

Turning to the matter of a remedy, the Court ruled in a 7–2 decision that the matter can be resolved by having all PTAB judicial decisions be subject to review by the Director of the patent office, who is appointed through the normal Appointments Clause process. Alito, Kavanaugh and Barrett joined Roberts in the plurality opinion on this matter. Justice Stephen Breyer wrote an opinion dissenting on the issue of APJs under the Appointments Clause, but concurring on the remedy judgement, joined by Sonia Sotomayor and Elena Kagan. The Court further ruled that prior PTAB decisions were not overruled but did allow such cases to be subject to the same review by the patent office director.

Justice Clarence Thomas wrote a dissenting opinion to both decisions to which Justices Breyer, Sotomayor, and Kagan joined in regards to the decision related to the Appointments Clause. Thomas believed the APJs should have been classified as inferior officers and thus not subject to the Appointments Clause. Thomas wrote "The court today draws a new line dividing inferior officers from principal ones. The fact that this line places administrative patent judges on the side of ambassadors, Supreme Court justices and department heads suggests that something is not quite right." In his dissent-in-part, Breyer wrote "Today’s decision is both unprecedented and unnecessary, and risks pushing the judiciary further into areas where we lack both the authority to act and the capacity to act wisely."

Justice Gorsuch wrote separately to dissent on the remedy, stating he would have turned to Congress to determine how to resolve the matter through their preferred system.
