= Brownback v. King =

- Supreme Court of the United States

Argued November 9, 2020 Decided February 25, 2021
- Full case name: Brownback v. King
- Docket no.: 19-546
- Citations: 592 U.S. 209 (more)

Holding
- A dismissal for failure to state a claim under the Federal Tort Claims Act is a judgement on the merits that triggers the FTCA's judgement bar on future actions.

Court membership
- Chief Justice John Roberts Associate Justices Clarence Thomas · Stephen Breyer; Samuel Alito · Sonia Sotomayor; Elena Kagan · Neil Gorsuch; Brett Kavanaugh · Amy Coney Barrett

Case opinions
- Majority: Thomas, joined by unanimous
- Concurrence: Sotomayor

Laws applied
- Federal Tort Claims Act, Fed. R. Civ. P. 12(b)(6)

Brownback v. King, 592 U.S. 209 (2021), was a United States Supreme Court case in which the Court held that a dismissal for failure to state a claim under the Federal Tort Claims Act (FTCA) is a judgment on the merits that triggers the FTCA's judgment bar on future actions.

== Background ==
Two undercover FBI agents mistakenly identified James King as a suspect and attempted to detain him. Without presenting themselves as police officers, they grabbed King and pushed him against an unmarked police vehicle and took his wallet out of his pocket. Thinking he was being mugged, King resisted the arrest. He was subsequently thrown to the ground and put in a chokehold. Once King regained consciousness, with the officer's arm still around his neck, he attempted to free himself and bit the officer on the arm. The agents severely beat him in retaliation. Bystanders called police, thinking they were witnessing a murder. When local police arrived, they ordered witnesses to delete video footage of the altercation because the videos could reveal the identities of undercover FBI officers and arrested King, despite confirming he was not the suspect they had been looking for. Although prosecutors charged him, a jury later acquitted him of all charges.

King then sued the United States and the agents under the FTCA, alleging violations of his Fourth Amendment rights for unreasonable seizure and excessive force. He also sued the agents individually under the implied cause of action recognized in the Supreme Court's decision in Bivens v. Six Unknown Named Agents.

The district court ruled that King's claims did not meet FTCA requirements and dismissed the case for lack of jurisdiction. It also dismissed King's Bivens claims and granted qualified immunity to the agents.

The U.S. Sixth Circuit Court of Appeals reversed, holding that the FTCA's "judgment bar" did not apply because the lower court had not ruled on the merits. The court also found that the agents were not entitled to qualified immunity, allowing King's claims to proceed.

== Opinion of the Court ==
The Supreme Court reversed. Justice Clarence Thomas authored the unanimous opinion of the Court.

The Court ruled that the district court's order dismissing King's FTCA claims was a judgment on the merits and thus triggered the FTCA's judgment bar to block his Bivens claims.

Justice Sonia Sotomayor wrote a concurring opinion that the Court did not decide whether a ruling on an FTCA claim prevents other related claims in the same lawsuit from moving forward.
