= FCC v. Prometheus Radio Project =

- Supreme Court of the United States

Argued January 19, 2021 Decided April 1, 2021
- Full case name: Federal Communications Commission, et al., v. Prometheus Radio Project, et al.
- Docket nos.: 19-1231; 19-1241
- Citations: 592 U.S. 414 (more)
- Argument: Oral argument

Case history
- Prior: Prometheus Radio Project v. FCC (Prometheus I) 373 F.3d 372 (3d Cir. 2004), cert. denied 545 U.S. 1123 (2005); Prometheus Radio Project v. FCC (Prometheus II) 652 F.3d 431 (3d Cir. 2011), cert. denied, 567 U.S. 951 (2012); Prometheus Radio Project v. FCC (Prometheus III) 824 F.3d 33 (3d Cir. 2016); Prometheus Radio Project v. FCC (Prometheus IV) 939 F.3d 567 (3d Cir. 2019), cert. accepted 141 S. Ct. 222 (2020)

Holding
- The FCC’s decision to repeal or modify the three ownership rules was not arbitrary and capricious for purposes of the APA

Court membership
- Chief Justice John Roberts Associate Justices Clarence Thomas · Stephen Breyer; Samuel Alito · Sonia Sotomayor; Elena Kagan · Neil Gorsuch; Brett Kavanaugh · Amy Coney Barrett

Case opinions
- Majority: Kavanaugh, joined by unanimous
- Concurrence: Thomas

Federal Communications Commission v. Prometheus Radio Project, 592 U.S. 414 (2021), was a United States Supreme Court case dealing with media ownership rules that the Federal Communications Commission (FCC) can set under the Telecommunications Act of 1996. The case dates back to the Third Circuit rulings from 2002 that have blocked FCC decisions to relax media ownership rules related to cross-ownership of newspapers with television and radio broadcast stations. In the present case, the Supreme Court ruled unanimously in April 2021 that the FCC had not made arbitrary and capricious rulemaking decisions in the context of the Administrative Procedure Act, nor had the requirement to review minority ownership of stations under Congressional mandate as stated in the Third Circuit's ruling, reversing this last ruling and allowing the FCC to proceed to relax cross-media ownership rules.

== Background ==
=== 1975 newspaper-broadcast cross-ownership rule ===
The Federal Communications Commission (FCC) was given authority under the Communications Act of 1934 to set media ownership rules of broadcast services in the United States, such as radio and television that served the same community. In 1975, the FCC enacted a rule restricting cross-media ownership, preventing newspapers from also owning broadcast services, as to reduce the concentration of media ownership that had been occurring in the years prior. While the FCC could not regulate newspapers, they could extend their regulation on broadcast services to cover cross-ownership.

The 1975 rule led to a number of debates on the cross-media ownership rules, as they were found to become barriers to entry into the market.

=== Telecommunications Act of 1996 ===
Among other functions, the Telecommunications Act of 1996 instructed the FCC to perform a review of its rules related to media ownership every four years and repeal rules that no longer made sense in the current market as to foster competition within the communications industry. In order to fulfill this review requirement the FCC requested public comment in 2002 seeking empirical evidence about the effects of media concentration on viewpoint diversity, and comment about the agency's policy role and authority under the Communications Act.

=== Prometheus Radio Project v. FCC ===
==== Prometheus I ====
The new rule enacted in 2003 partially repealed the cross-media ownership limitations, as the FCC found that the rule was no longer necessary in the public interest to maintain competition, diversity, or localism. However, it maintained some limited ownership controls through a diversity index based on the Herfindahl–Hirschman Index to determine if market consolidation was an issue.

The FCC's 2003 decision of the cross-media ownership limitations was challenged by several groups, with the primary legal challenge led by the Prometheus Radio Project, a non-profit advocacy group campaigning against media consolidation. The suit reached the Third Circuit Court of Appeals, which ruled in Prometheus Radio Project v. FCC (or Prometheus I) that the FCC had not provided a reasonable rationale for its decision, specifically for how the diversity index was calculated with the inclusion of Internet coverage. The Third Circuit placed a stay on the new cross-media limit rules, and required the FCC to maintain the pre-2002 rules for cross-ownership.

==== Prometheus II ====
The FCC's next required review under the Telecommunications Act came in 2006, which included reassessing the Third Circuit's Prometheus I decision alongside commissioned studies on the state and impact of changing the cross-ownership rules. The FCC said it issued new rules in 2008, primarily limiting owners of newspapers to owning one television or one radio station in the top twenty urban markets. The rules also created a new class of minority-owned broadcasters, which had been suggested from the Prometheus I decision as to assure there would be viewpoint diversity.

The new rules were again challenged by the Prometheus Radio Project, which the Third Circuit heard in 2011 as Prometheus Radio Project v. FCC (Prometheus II). The Third Circuit ruled to maintain the stay on the new rules, stating that the FCC still had not shown good justification for the new cross-ownership rules and minority ownership concerns that the court had previously raised. The court did reassert that there was a substantial state interest in promoting diversity.

==== Prometheus III ====
With the ongoing action in Prometheus II, the FCC failed to complete its 2010 or 2014 review, and what efforts had been performed had not followed on the cross-media ownership aspects. The lack of inaction on these matters led to a third suit, Prometheus Radio Project v. FCC (Prometheus III) in 2016 in the Third Circuit. The court ordered the FCC to complete the 2010 and 2014 reviews and issue a new proposed cross-media ownership rule by the end of 2016, since there was a compelling drive to replace the 1975 rule and the FCC's delay was hampering the process. By August 2016, the FCC issued its new rules that for all purposes left the 1975 rule in place with small modifications, such as for a failing newspaper to receive investments from a local television or radio station.

==== Prometheus IV ====
The new rules were seen as inaction by many media companies, which had been losing revenue over the previous years, and a fourth iteration of Prometheus Radio Project v. FCC (Prometheus IV) began in the courts. While the case was under litigation, newly elected Donald Trump replaced the FCC chairmen with Ajit Pai, who led the FCC to release two new orders related to media ownership in 2017 and 2018. The 2017 orders overrode parts of the 2016 rules and essentially eliminated the cross-ownership restrictions from 1975, while the 2018 order addressed minority ownership to allow larger companies to incubate minority-owned stations as to meet diversity goals. Both orders were challenged, and the cases consolidated into the ongoing Prometheus IV case at the Third Circuit. The Third Circuit ruled in September 2019 that the FCC still had not "adequately considered the effects" of the new rules on "diversity in broadcast media ownership," vacating both the 2017 and 2018 rules. The Third Circuit criticized the FCC's proposed orders for failing to consider gender or social disadvantage diversity alongside racial diversity as part of its incubator program or in relaxing the ownership rules. The decision left parts of the 2016 rules but otherwise returned media ownership back to the 1975 restrictions.

== Supreme Court ==
While prior Third Circuit decisions have been petitioned to the Supreme Court, the Court has not agreed to hear the prior cases. The FCC petitioned to the Supreme Court to challenge the ruling from Prometheus IV in April 2020 with the support of the United States Department of Justice. The Supreme Court granted the petition in October 2020, consolidated it with a challenge from the National Association of Broadcasters, with oral arguments heard on January 19, 2021. Observers believed that a majority of the Justices on both conservative and liberal sides may side with the FCC as the Justices questioned whether the FCC needed to account for minority ownership under the original 1996 law, which has been a limiting factor in the Third Circuit's decisions in the past cases, and that under the Administrative Procedure Act, the FCC has shown it has done a sufficient amount of evaluation in its rule-making evaluations to all other factors relating to public interest of media ownership.

The Court issued its unanimous ruling on April 1, 2021, reversing the Third Circuit's most recent decision. The majority opinion was written by Justice Brett Kavanaugh and joined by all other Justices. Kavanaugh wrote that the Court found that the FCC's decision to modify or eliminate the prior cross-media ownership rules were not arbitrary and capricious and thus did not violate the APA. Justice Clarence Thomas also wrote a concurrence.
