= Carney v. Adams =

- Supreme Court of the United States

Decided December 10, 2020
- Full case name: Carney v. Adams
- Docket no.: 19-309
- Citations: 592 U.S. ___ (more)

Holding
- Because Adams did not show that he was "able and ready" to apply for a judicial vacancy in the imminent future, he failed to show a "personal," "concrete" and "imminent" injury necessary for Article III standing.

Court membership
- Chief Justice John Roberts Associate Justices Clarence Thomas · Stephen Breyer; Samuel Alito · Sonia Sotomayor; Elena Kagan · Neil Gorsuch; Brett Kavanaugh · Amy Coney Barrett

Case opinion
- Majority: Breyer, joined by unanimous

Laws applied
- Article III

Carney v. Adams, 592 U.S. ___ (2020), was a United States Supreme Court case in which the Court held that, because Adams did not show that he was "able and ready" to apply for a judicial vacancy in the imminent future, he failed to show a "personal," "concrete" and "imminent" injury necessary for Article III standing.

== Background ==
Delaware's Constitution contains a political-balance requirement for appointments to the state's major courts. No more than a bare majority of judges on any of its five major courts "shall be of the same political party." In addition, on three of those courts, those members not in the bare majority "shall be of the other major political party." Respondent James R. Adams, a Delaware lawyer and political independent, sued in Federal District Court, claiming that Delaware’s "bare majority" and "major party" requirements violate his First Amendment right to freedom of association by making him ineligible to become a judge unless he joins a major political party. The district court held that Adams had standing to challenge both requirements and that Delaware's balancing scheme was unconstitutional. The Third Circuit affirmed in part and reversed in part. It held that Adams did have standing to challenge the major party requirement, because it categorically excludes independents from becoming judges on three courts, but that he lacked standing to challenge the bare majority requirement, which does not preclude independents from eligibility for any vacancy.
