= City of Chicago v. Fulton =

- Supreme Court of the United States

Decided January 14, 2021
- Full case name: City of Chicago v. Fulton
- Docket no.: 19-357
- Citations: 592 U.S. ___ (more)

Holding
- The mere retention of estate property after the filing of a bankruptcy petition does not violate 11 U.S.C. § 362(a)(3), which operates as a "stay" of "any act" to "exercise control" over the property of the estate.

Court membership
- Chief Justice John Roberts Associate Justices Clarence Thomas · Stephen Breyer; Samuel Alito · Sonia Sotomayor; Elena Kagan · Neil Gorsuch; Brett Kavanaugh · Amy Coney Barrett

Case opinion
- Majority: Alito, joined by unanimous

Laws applied
- Bankruptcy Code

City of Chicago v. Fulton, 592 U.S. ___ (2021), was a United States Supreme Court case in which the Court held that the mere retention of estate property after the filing of a bankruptcy petition does not violate 11 U.S.C. § 362(a)(3), which operates as a "stay" of "any act" to "exercise control" over the property of the estate.
