= Pereida v. Wilkinson =

- Supreme Court of the United States

Argued October 14, 2020 Decided March 4, 2021
- Full case name: Clemente Avelino Pereida v. Robert M. Wilkinson, Acting Attorney General
- Docket no.: 19-438
- Citations: 592 U.S. ___ (more)
- Argument: Oral argument

Holding
- Under the INA, certain nonpermanent residents seeking to cancel a lawful removal order bear the burden of showing they have not been convicted of a disqualifying offense.

Court membership
- Chief Justice John Roberts Associate Justices Clarence Thomas · Stephen Breyer; Samuel Alito · Sonia Sotomayor; Elena Kagan · Neil Gorsuch; Brett Kavanaugh · Amy Coney Barrett

Case opinions
- Majority: Gorsuch, joined by Roberts, Thomas, Alito, Kavanaugh
- Dissent: Breyer, joined by Sotomayor, Kagan
- Barrett took no part in the consideration or decision of the case.

Laws applied
- Immigration and Nationality Act (INA)

Pereida v. Wilkinson, 592 U.S. ___ (2021), was a United States Supreme Court case in which the Court ruled that a non-citizen seeking cancellation of an administrative removal order does not meet the statutory burden of proving their eligibility for cancellation under the Immigration and Nationality Act (INA) unless they can show that a past criminal conviction was not disqualifying, even if they were convicted under a state divisible statute containing multiple offenses, not all of which are disqualifying, and the record is ambiguous about which subsection the non-citizen was convicted under.

== Background ==
Clemente Avelino Pereida was a citizen of Mexico who entered the United States without authorization or inspection in approximately 1995. He relocated to Nebraska with his family, was gainfully employed and paid taxes, and with his wife raised three children, one a U.S. citizen and another a Deferred Action for Childhood Arrivals recipient. After an arrest, he was identified as an unlawfully present alien, and placed into removal proceedings in 2009. He did not contest his removability but instead applied to cancel his removal and adjust status to a lawful permanent resident.

=== Statute ===
Under the INA, noncitizens who are not lawful permanent residents must prove they meet the four eligibility requirements before they can apply for cancellation of removal:

1. They have been physically present in the United States for a continuous period of not less than 10 years immediately preceding the application
2. They have been a person of good moral character during such period
3. They have not been convicted of an offense that would either render them inadmissible to be admitted to the United States or deportable from the United States
4. Removal would result in exceptional and extremely unusual hardship to the alien's qualifying relative who is a United States citizen or lawful permanent resident.

The INA requires the individual requesting cancellation of removal to prove their eligibility, which includes proving they were not convicted of a disqualifying crime. In Pereida the Court said the INA's burden of proof required individuals like Pereida to produce evidence on their own when the documents produced by state courts and law enforcement are ambiguous. Pereida's case contested the INA's burden of proof should not include a burden of producing evidence.

=== Criminal case ===
In his criminal case, state authorities charged Pereida with attempted criminal impersonation for using a false Social Security card to seek employment at National Service Company of Iowa.

The Nebraska Statute section 28-608 (2008) listed four separate offenses that could result in a conviction for the crime of attempted criminal impersonation. Pereida pleaded no contest to the misdemeanor charge of "criminal impersonation". He paid a fine and served no jail time for the offense.

=== Immigration consequences: Categorical approach ===
All crimes that trigger federal immigration consequences have technical, legal definitions under federal law. The categorical approach is a method used by courts to determine whether a prior state conviction qualifies as a corresponding federal crime that triggers federal immigration consequences.

The federal crime is often something generic like "aggavated felony", "crime of violence", or, in Pereida's case, a crime involving moral turpitude (CIMT). The state law may be broader than the federal definition. In Pereida's case, only three of the four offenses met the federal definition for CIMT. (Note: Crimes that include fraud as an element have been considered CIMT since Jordan v. DeGeorge (1951).) When the statute is divisible, listing offenses with separate elements, courts apply a modified categorical approach by reviewing evidence, called Shepard documents, to decide which subpart of the statute formed the basis of a conviction.

== Immigration proceeding ==
Pereida applied to the Attorney General for discretionary cancellation of removal through the Executive Office for Immigration Review (EOIR), a subagency of the United States Department of Justice.

The United States Department of Homeland Security produced his criminal complaint but that document did not specify which of the four subsections of the Nebraska statute he actually violated. Not all of the subsections involved moral turpitude.

The EOIR Immigration Judge presiding over his case determined that Pereida's attempted criminal impersonation conviction was a CIMT that disqualified him from cancellation of removal and ordered him removed from the United States.

=== Appeals ===
Pereida appealed to the Board of Immigration Appeals (BIA). Although the BIA found no record as to which subpart of the state criminal law he was convicted under, they noted that Pereida bore the burden of proving that his conviction was not a CIMT, and dismissed his appeal.

Pereida appealed to the Eighth Circuit to apply a modified categorical approach to resolve the ambiguity of the legal record in his favor. The Eighth Circuit denied his appeal, holding that under the modified categorical approach they were unable to discern which means he was convicted.

But because it was his burden to demonstrate eligibility for relief, he had the obligation to establish that his conviction was not a CIMT, and his failure to produce sufficient conviction records meant he did not carry his burden and thus was ineligible for cancellation of removal. The Eighth Circuit noted that the absence of the necessary substantive determination of the existence of a CIMT precluded any inquiry of the petty offense exception. Pereida petitioned for rehearing on en banc which the Eighth Circuit denied.

The United States Supreme Court granted Pereida's certiorari petition on December 18, 2019.

== United States Supreme Court ==
On March 4, 2021, the Court issued its opinion in a 5–3 ruling affirming the Eighth Circuit's decision. Justice Neil Gorsuch wrote the majority opinion and was joined by Justices Brett Kavanaugh, Samuel Alito, Clarence Thomas, and Chief Justice John Roberts. The Court heard oral arguments from the parties on October 14, 2020. Prior to the oral arguments, Justice Ruth Bader Ginsburg had died, while her replacement, Justice Amy Coney Barrett, had not yet been confirmed. As such, Justice Barrett did not participate in the case.

=== Decision ===
The majority held that Pereida had not meet the burden of proof to establish his eligibility for discretionary cancellation of removal. Under the INA, an alien bears the burden of proving they are eligible, including proving they have not been convicted of a "crime involving moral turpitude". The Court held that this burden of proof applied to divisible statutes like the Nebraska statute under which Pereida was convicted. Having accepted a plea agreement, Pereida was not able to establish that he was convicted under a subsection that did not involve turpitude. The court held that if the evidence is inconclusive or unavailable in documents prepared by the state court, the burden to produce the evidence falls on the applicant under the INA.

While the Sixth Amendment mandates a jury determination for sentencing enhancement under Armed Career Criminal Act (ACCA), the majority explains that the immigration context is different because the Sixth Amendment presents no obstacle to the INA shifting the burden of proof to aliens after alienage is proved. Yale law professor Kate Stith says this conclusion minimized the relevant role of due process protections.

Unable to prove that he was not convicted of a crime involving moral turpitude, Pereida argued that the inconclusive record should be construed in his favor because the burden of proof only applies to questions of fact. When the court applies the categorial approach it is only deciding if a state crime is a categorical match to a generic federal definition that triggers federal penalties. The accuracy of facts underlying a state conviction are not questioned. Applying the modified categorical approach to the divisible state statute, the Court explained that there were two inquiries, factual and hypothetical. The introduction of a "threshold factual question" made the burden of proof relevant.

The Court found that Pereida's failure to produce any evidence as to the actual crime of conviction meant they could not proceed to tackle the hypothetical question, and thus he failed to carry his burden of proving he had not been convicted of a disqualifying crime, as required by the INA.

Justice Gorsuch wondered about the applicability of Shepard v. United States in immigration proceedings, raising the possibility that applicants could submit a broader range of evidence than what is allowed in criminal trials.

=== Breyer's dissent ===
Justice Stephen Breyer wrote the dissenting opinion, joined by Justices Elena Kagan and Sonia Sotomayor. Breyer said the case "has little or nothing to do with burdens of proof". Breyer stated that the modified categorical approach was limited to a set of court records under Shepard. Those records did not specify the subsection of the conviction. This fact alone should have been enough to satisfy the court's inquiry under the modified categorical approach. By placing the burden on the alien "to introduce a wide range of documentary evidence and testimony to establish", the dissent said the Court created a high standard of burden that many aliens may not be able to meet.

Breyer continued that the burden should be on the government to prove that the crime was one of moral turpitude rather than the alien, and that in Pereida's case, this had not yet been shown by the government.
