= Rutledge v. Pharmaceutical Care Management Ass'n =

- Supreme Court of the United States

Decided December 10, 2020
- Full case name: Rutledge v. Pharmaceutical Care Management Ass'n
- Docket no.: 18-540
- Citations: 592 U.S. ___ (more)

Holding
- State statutes are only preempted by ERISA if they have an "impermissible connection" to ERISA plans or they "refer to" ERISA plans.

Court membership
- Chief Justice John Roberts Associate Justices Clarence Thomas · Stephen Breyer; Samuel Alito · Sonia Sotomayor; Elena Kagan · Neil Gorsuch; Brett Kavanaugh · Amy Coney Barrett

Case opinions
- Majority: Sotomayor, joined by unanimous
- Concurrence: Thomas

Laws applied
- Employee Retirement Income Security Act of 1974

Rutledge v. Pharmaceutical Care Management Ass'n, 592 U.S. ___ (2020), was a United States Supreme Court case in which the court held that state statutes are only preempted by the Employee Retirement Income Security Act of 1974 (ERISA) if they have an "impermissible connection" to ERISA plans or they "refer to" ERISA plans.

== See also ==
- Egelhoff v. Egelhoff
