= United States Fish and Wildlife Service v. Sierra Club =

- Supreme Court of the United States

Argued November 2, 2020 Decided March 4, 2021
- Full case name: United States Fish and Wildlife Service, et al. v. Sierra Club, Inc.
- Docket no.: 19-547
- Citations: 592 U.S. 261 (more)
- Argument: Oral argument
- Decision: Opinion

Case history
- Prior: Sierra Club, Inc. v. United States Fish & Wildlife Serv., 925 F.3d 1000 (9th Cir. 2019); cert. granted, 140 S. Ct. 1262 (2020).

Holding
- The deliberative process privilege protects from disclosure under FOIA in-house draft biological opinions that are both predecisional and deliberative, even if the drafts reflect the agencies' last views about a proposal.

Court membership
- Chief Justice John Roberts Associate Justices Clarence Thomas · Stephen Breyer; Samuel Alito · Sonia Sotomayor; Elena Kagan · Neil Gorsuch; Brett Kavanaugh · Amy Coney Barrett

Case opinions
- Majority: Barrett, joined by Roberts, Thomas, Alito, Kagan, Gorsuch, Kavanaugh
- Dissent: Breyer, joined by Sotomayor

Laws applied
- Freedom of Information Act (FOIA), 5 U.S.C. § 552(b)

United States Fish and Wildlife Service v. Sierra Club, Inc., 592 U.S. 261 (2021), was a United States Supreme Court case involving whether the use of a Freedom of Information Act (FOIA) request can be used to access documents from a U.S. agency that are protected under the deliberative process privilege exemption, in this specific case, draft biological opinions made and reviewed by the United States Fish and Wildlife Service (FWS) and the National Marine Fisheries Service (NMFS) prior to a final rulemaking decision by the Environmental Protection Agency (EPA) related to impacts on endangered aquatic species, requested by the Sierra Club. The Court ruled in a 7–2 decision in 2021 that the government does not have to disclose "draft biological opinions" involving potential threats to endangered species, even though the drafts reflect an agency's final proposal. The ruling limits environmental groups' ability to obtain government documents using the FOIA.

== Background ==
In 2011, the Environmental Protection Agency (EPA) proposed a new rule for using water from natural sources for cooling of industrial equipment. Since aquatic species may be drawn up in the uptake of this water, including endangered species, the EPA was required under the Endangered Species Act of 1973 to consult with the United States Fish and Wildlife Service (FWS) and the National Marine Fisheries Service (NMFS) to determine if this rule would properly safeguard endangered species before finalizing the rule. This included creating biological opinions on whether the EPA's rule put endangered species in jeopardy or not.

Over the next two years, the EPA consulted with the FWS and NMFS adjusting the proposed rule to address initial concerns. The FWS and NMFS agreed to provide the biological opinions that the Endangered Species Act required, and had developed draft versions by the end of 2013 that both stated that the EPA's proposed rule (as amended through 2013) would put endangered species in jeopardy. Instead of sharing these with the EPA, both the FWS and NMFS decided instead to extend their consultations with the EPA into 2014. After a few months, the EPA released a new proposed rule that was significantly different from the original 2011 rule. The FWS and NFMS subsequently provided "no jeopardy" biological opinions to the EPA that supported implementation of the new rule. The EPA formally issued this new rule in March 2014 after receiving these reports.

The Sierra Club sought information on the background of this rule by using Freedom of Information Act (FOIA) requests to obtain all the documentation behind its development. While both the FWS and NMFS provided much of their documentation in their consultation period with the EPA, they did not provide the 2013 draft biological opinions, asserting these were protected by deliberative process privilege, one of the allowed FOIA exemptions, and previously affirmed by case law in 1975 by NLRB v. Sears, Roebuck & Co. as to protect "documents reflecting advisory opinions, recommendations and deliberations comprising part of a process by which governmental decisions and policies are formulated". The Sierra Club was seeking to obtain these draft opinions of the EPA regarding rules governing underwater structures used to cool industrial equipment. Specifically, the Sierra Club wanted to see the report about how the intake systems could harm endangered species. The Sierra Club sued in the Northern District of California for release of these draft opinions, since they reflected on the state of the proposed 2013 EPA rather than its final 2014 rule. The district court agreed with the Sierra Club in July 2017 and ordered release of the drafts, which was upheld on appeal by the government by the Ninth Circuit in December 2018.

== Supreme Court ==
The agencies petitioned the Supreme Court to hear the case on the question of whether the draft documents were covered under the deliberative process privilege. The Supreme Court granted certiorari in March 2020, with oral arguments on November 2, 2020. In the interim, Justice Ruth Bader Ginsburg died, and Justice Amy Coney Barrett was confirmed as her replacement in October 2020; this became her first case on the Supreme Court.

The court issued its ruling on March 4, 2021. In her first merit opinion, Justice Barrett wrote the majority opinion, her first majority opinion, joined by all but Justices Stephen Breyer and Sonia Sotomayor in the 7–2 decision. The majority ruled in favor of the FWS and NMFS, reversing the Ninth Circuit's decision and remanding the case for further review. Barrett stated that the 2013 draft biological opinions were, within the scope of the deliberative process, "drafts of a draft" and not treated as drafts of a final view on the 2013 rule, and thus were protected information within the FOIA exemption.

=== Dissent ===
Justice Breyer wrote a dissent, joined by Sotomayor. Breyer agreed in the principle that draft copies well prior to any final report would be protected under the deliberative process privilege, but argued that the 2013 drafts were not simply drafts but one step removed from final biological opinions, given the procedural history, and thus should not have been protected from the FOIA exemption.

Breyer argued that because the EPA uses information from drafts to make final decisions, the Sierra Club must be permitted to obtain the drafts. He wrote: "Agency practice shows that the Draft Biological Opinion, not the Final Biological Opinion, is the document that informs the EPA of the Services' conclusions about jeopardy and alternatives and triggers within the EPA the process of deciding what to do about those conclusions. If a Final Biological Opinion is discoverable under FOIA, as all seem to agree it is, why would a Draft Biological Opinion, embodying the same Service conclusions (and leaving the EPA with the same four choices), not be?" Breyer also noted the rarity of final biological opinions. He also wrote:"To hold that Draft Biological Opinions are discoverable when a private party seeks an EPA permit but not when, as here, the EPA seeks to write a generally applicable rule that governs private party conduct seems highly anomalous. Even where there is no private applicant, the evaluating agencies have a long history of disclosing Draft Biological Opinions to the public."
