= Torres v. Madrid =

- Supreme Court of the United States

Argued October 14, 2020 Decided March 25, 2021
- Full case name: Roxanne Torres v. Janice Madrid, et al.
- Docket no.: 19-292
- Citations: 592 U.S. 306 (more)

Case history
- Prior: Summary judgment granted, Torres v. Madrid, No. 1:16-cv-01163, 2018 WL 4148405 (D.N.M. Aug. 30, 2018); Affirmed, 769 F. App'x 654 (10th Cir. 2019); Cert. granted, 140 S. Ct. 680 (2019)

Holding
- The application of physical force to the body of a person with intent to restrain is a seizure even if the person does not submit and is not subdued.

Court membership
- Chief Justice John Roberts Associate Justices Clarence Thomas · Stephen Breyer; Samuel Alito · Sonia Sotomayor; Elena Kagan · Neil Gorsuch; Brett Kavanaugh · Amy Coney Barrett

Case opinions
- Majority: Roberts, joined by Breyer, Sotomayor, Kagan, Kavanaugh
- Dissent: Gorsuch, joined by Thomas, Alito
- Barrett took no part in the consideration or decision of the case.

Laws applied
- U.S. Const. amend. IV

Torres v. Madrid, 592 U.S. 306 (2021), was a United States Supreme Court case based on what constitutes a "seizure" in the context of the Fourth Amendment to the United States Constitution, in the immediate case, in the situation where law enforcement had attempted to use physical force to stop a suspect but failed to do so. The Court ruled in a 5–3 decision that the use of physical force with the intent to restrain a person, even if that fails to restrain the person, is considered a seizure.

== Background ==
In July 2014, police officers were on a stakeout of an apartment complex in Albuquerque, New Mexico, to serve a warrant to a person known to be living there. Roxanne Torres had driven to the complex to drop off a passenger. At the time, she was under the influence of methamphetamines, and had been for two days. Two of the officers approached her car as a possible person of interest, and gave her instructions to get out of the car or allow them to open the doors. However, as it was dark, and both officers were in darker clothing and tactical vests, though still wore police badges, Torres mistook their orders as a possible carjacking and began to set the car in motion. The officers believed she was driving towards them, and fired multiple shots into the vehicle. Torres was hit multiple times but continued to drive the car off and away from the officers, evading any immediate pursuit, and eventually to a hospital to be treated. Having an outstanding warrant herself, she provided a false name on admittance before she was arrested.

Several legal actions followed. Torres pleaded no contest in 2015 to several counts including evading a law enforcement officer and assault on an officer. The district attorney's office reviewed the case and declined to file any charges against the officers as body cam footage showed both wore the identification identifying them as officers.

Torres filed a civil action against the officers in the United States District Court for the District of New Mexico, asserting that the officers' use of gunfire was "excessive force" under the Fourth Amendment to the United States Constitution. Torres argued that the officers' actions prior to her trying to move the car amounted to an arrest and seizure, and thus the use of gunfire to stop her was unreasonable at that point. The district court judge concluded that in the situation at hand, Torres had never been arrested or seized by the officers so the Fourth Amendment rights did not apply as they never had physical control of Torres. As all other actions that officers took fell within qualified immunity, the District Court granted summary judgement to the officers. Torres appealed to the United States Court of Appeals for the Tenth Circuit. The Tenth Circuit affirmed the District Court's judgement, in that Torres was never arrested or seized, and thus has no Fourth Amendment claim.

== Supreme Court ==
Torres petitioned to the Supreme Court on the question whether the unsuccessful attempt to detain her was considered a "seizure" within context of the Fourth Amendment. The petition argued that the Tenth Circuit's decision was at odds with California v. Hodari D., the prevailing standard for what constitutes a "seizure", and with precedence of three other Circuit Courts. The Supreme Court agreed in December 2019 to hear the case prior to June 2020, but due to the COVID-19 pandemic, was pushed to be heard on October 14, 2020.

Justice Amy Coney Barrett did not participate on the case, as at the time the case was argued she had yet to be confirmed to replace Justice Ruth Bader Ginsburg following her death.

The Supreme Court issued its decision on March 25, 2021. The 5–3 majority opinion reversed the Tenth Circuit's ruling and remanded the case for further review. Chief Justice John Roberts wrote the majority opinion, joined by Justices Stephen Breyer, Sonia Sotomayor, Elena Kagan, and Brett Kavanaugh. Roberts wrote in his opinion, "The officers' shooting applied physical force to her body and objectively manifested an intent to restrain her from driving away. We therefore conclude that the officers seized Torres for the instant that the bullets struck her."

Justice Neil Gorsuch wrote the dissenting opinion that was joined by Justices Clarence Thomas and Samuel Alito. Gorsuch wrote "The majority's need to resort to such a schizophrenic reading of the word 'seizure' should be a signal that something has gone seriously wrong. Today, for the first time, the majority seeks to equate seizures and criminal arrests with mere touches, attempted seizures and batteries."
