= Taylor v. Riojas =

- Supreme Court of the United States

Decided November 2, 2020
- Full case name: Trent Michael Taylor v. Robert Riojas, et al.
- Docket no.: 19-1261
- Citations: 592 U.S. 7 (more)

Holding
- The officers were not entitled to qualified immunity; no reasonable correctional officer could have concluded that, under these extreme circumstances, it was constitutionally permissible to house Taylor in such deplorably unsanitary conditions for an extended period of time.

Court membership
- Chief Justice John Roberts Associate Justices Clarence Thomas · Stephen Breyer; Samuel Alito · Sonia Sotomayor; Elena Kagan · Neil Gorsuch; Brett Kavanaugh · Amy Coney Barrett

Case opinions
- Per curiam
- Concurrence: Alito (in judgment)
- Dissent: Thomas
- Barrett took no part in the consideration or decision of the case.

Taylor v. Riojas, 592 U.S. 7 (2020), was a United States Supreme Court case dealing with qualified immunity. It was the first case in which the Supreme Court relied on the obviousness of a constitutional violation to overturn a lower court's decision to grant qualified immunity.

Trent Taylor was an inmate in a Texas prison. He filed a pro se lawsuit alleging that he was confined for six days "in a pair of shockingly unsanitary cells." The District Court found no constitutional violation and granted summary judgment. The Fifth Circuit found that Taylor's rights were violated, but concluded that summary judgment was still appropriate because the defendants "weren’t on 'fair warning' that their specific acts were unconstitutional." The Supreme Court summarily reversed in a per curiam decision. Justice Alito concurred in the judgment, because he agreed with the Court's decision on the merits, but disagreed with the Court's decision to review the case in the first place. Justice Thomas dissented without providing a written opinion.
