= Pakdel v. City and County of San Francisco =

2021 United States Supreme Court case

- Supreme Court of the United States

Decided June 28, 2021
- Full case name: Pakdel v. City and County of San Francisco
- Docket no.: 20-1212
- Citations: 594 U.S. ___ (more)

Questions presented
- Whether a regulatory takings claim is ripe for federal court review when a property owner has not exhausted state administrative remedies, but the government has reached a de facto final decision regarding the property?

Holding
- Plaintiffs do not need to perform administrative exhaustion of state remedies to file a Section 1983 takings claim when the state has reached a conclusive position.

Court membership
- Chief Justice John Roberts Associate Justices Clarence Thomas · Stephen Breyer; Samuel Alito · Sonia Sotomayor; Elena Kagan · Neil Gorsuch; Brett Kavanaugh · Amy Coney Barrett

Case opinion
- Per curiam

Laws applied
- U.S. Const. amend. V 42 U.S. Code § 1983 – Civil action for deprivation of rights

Pakdel v. City and County of San Francisco, 594 U.S. ___ (2021), is a United States Supreme Court case whose decision was issued per curiam on June 28, 2021. In this case, the petitioners were represented by Jeffrey W. McCoy and Erin E. Wilcox of the public interest law firm, Pacific Legal Foundation. The respondents were represented by Kristen A. Jensen and Christopher T. Tom of the San Francisco City Attorney's office.

== Background ==
Peyman Pakdel and his wife owned a tenancy-in-common (TIC) apartment in San Francisco. The petitioners along with other owners entered into an agreement to convert the 6 units of the building into condominiums. A 2015 San Francisco ordinance required non-occupant owners of the units to mandatorily provide lifetime lease for their tenants. Subsequently, the petitioners and the other owners acquired the city's approval for the conversion.

Eventually the petitioners offered to buy out their existing tenant's lease in exchange for the tenant voluntarily vacating the property, the tenant declined. Pursuant to this, the petitioners filed a suit in the United States District Court for the Northern District of California against the respondent. The District Court, citing Williamson County Regional Planning Commission v. Hamilton Bank of Johnson City ruled that the petitioners' takings claim was not "ripe" for federal resolution until the petitioners had exhausted all state remedies. Despite the subsequent overturning of the Williamson County case by the Supreme Court, the Ninth Circuit court affirmed the District Court's dismissal of the case.

=== Arguments ===
The petitioners, including Pakdel, argued that the lifetime lease mandate was an unconstitutional regulatory taking. They claimed that the mandate violated the protections guaranteed under the fourth and fifth amendment takings clauses as it unlawfully seizes the owners' property and infringes upon the owners' right to occupy their property.

The respondents, including San Francisco, argued that the petitioners had to exhaust all the state remedies available to them and therefore did not satisfy the "finality" requirement of the state.

== Ruling ==
The Supreme Court summarily reversed the Ninth Circuit Court's dismissal of the suit without any oral arguments or additional briefs per curiam. It held that the position of the city was final, i.e. it required the petitioners to execute the lifetime lease or face "enforcement actions". It also recognized that such a position inflicted a clear injury upon the petitioners, making the dispute ripe for judicial resolution.
