= Goldman Sachs Group, Inc. v. Arkansas Teacher Retirement System =

- Supreme Court of the United States

Argued March 29, 2021 Decided June 21, 2021
- Full case name: Goldman Sachs Group, Inc., et al. v. Arkansas Teacher Retirement System, et al.
- Docket no.: 20-222
- Citations: 594 U.S. ___ (more)

Holding
- Defendants bear the burden of persuasion to prove a lack of price impact by a preponderance of the evidence at class certification.

Court membership
- Chief Justice John Roberts Associate Justices Clarence Thomas · Stephen Breyer; Samuel Alito · Sonia Sotomayor; Elena Kagan · Neil Gorsuch; Brett Kavanaugh · Amy Coney Barrett

Case opinions
- Majority: Barrett, joined by Roberts, Breyer, Kagan, Kavanaugh; Thomas, Alito, Gorsuch (Parts I and II–A); Sotomayor (Parts I, II–A–1, and II–B)
- Concur/dissent: Sotomayor
- Concur/dissent: Gorsuch, joined by Thomas, Alito

Goldman Sachs Group, Inc. v. Arkansas Teacher Retirement System, 594 U.S. ___ (2021), was a 2021 decision of the Supreme Court of the United States in which the court held that defendants bear the burden of persuasion to prove a lack of price impact by a preponderance of the evidence at class certification. The case was about securities.

== Background ==
A group of investors sued Goldman Sachs after the 2008 financial crisis to recover up to $13 billion in losses. In 2020, a panel of the United States Court of Appeals for the Second Circuit allowed the class action to proceed, by a 2–1 vote. Judge Richard J. Sullivan dissented.

== Decision ==
The Supreme Court issued its decision in June 2021, vacating the court of appeals' judgment and remanding for further proceedings. A unanimous court found that the presumption of classwide reliance established in Basic Inc. v. Levinson required the defendant's statements to be more than just generic guarantees. An 8–1 court, with Justice Sonia Sotomayor dissenting, found that the lower court had not adequately followed this framework, and remanded for further proceedings. A 6–3 court, with Justice Neil Gorsuch dissenting, joined by Justices Clarence Thomas and Samuel Alito, held that defendants have the burden of proof in rebutting the presumption of reliance.
