= Texas v. New Mexico =

- Supreme Court of the United States

Argued October 5, 2020 Decided December 14, 2020
- Full case name: Texas v. New Mexico
- Docket no.: 22O65
- Citations: 592 U.S. ___ (more)
- Argument: Oral argument

Holding
- 1. New Mexico's motion for credit for the evaporated water was not untimely.; 2. New Mexico is entitled to delivery credit for the evaporated water.

Court membership
- Chief Justice John Roberts Associate Justices Clarence Thomas · Stephen Breyer; Samuel Alito · Sonia Sotomayor; Elena Kagan · Neil Gorsuch; Brett Kavanaugh · Amy Coney Barrett

Case opinions
- Majority: Kavanaugh, joined by Roberts, Thomas, Breyer, Sotomayor, Kagan, Gorsuch
- Concur/dissent: Alito
- Barrett took no part in the consideration or decision of the case.

Texas v. New Mexico, 592 U.S. ___ (2020), is a long-running United States Supreme Court case between the U.S. states of Texas and New Mexico regarding the Pecos River Compact. It was decided on December 14, 2020.

== Background ==
In 2014, heavy rainfall brought by Tropical Storm Odile dumped large amounts of water into the Pecos River basin. This resulted in the Brantley Dam along the Pecos River being unable to hold all of the water and it was released downstream. Texas then emptied 40,000 acre-feet of water from its Red Bluff Reservoir to accommodate the flow. New Mexico holds that the unused water counts toward Texas' allotment under the Pecos River Compact; Texas disputes this.
