= HollyFrontier Cheyenne Refining, LLC v. Renewable Fuels Ass'n =

- Supreme Court of the United States

Argued April 27, 2021 Decided June 25, 2021
- Full case name: HollyFrontier Cheyenne Refining, LLC, et al. v. Renewable Fuels Association, et al.
- Docket no.: 20-472
- Citations: 594 U.S. 382 (more) 141 S.Ct. 2172

Holding
- A small refinery that previously received a hardship exemption may obtain an "extension" under §7545(o)(9)(B)(i) even if it saw a lapse in exemption coverage in a previous year.

Court membership
- Chief Justice John Roberts Associate Justices Clarence Thomas · Stephen Breyer; Samuel Alito · Sonia Sotomayor; Elena Kagan · Neil Gorsuch; Brett Kavanaugh · Amy Coney Barrett

Case opinions
- Majority: Gorsuch, joined by Roberts, Thomas, Breyer, Alito, Kavanaugh
- Dissent: Barrett, joined by Sotomayor, Kagan

HollyFrontier Cheyenne Refining, LLC v. Renewable Fuels Association, 594 U.S. 382 (2021), was a United States Supreme Court case dealing with exemptions from blending requirements for small refineries set by the Renewable Fuel Standard program. The case dealt with the statutory interpretation of the congressional language for extending the exemption, if this allowed a lapse in the exemption or not. In a 6–3 decision, the Supreme Court ruled that by the majority's interpretation of the law, the congressional law did allow for refineries to seek extensions after their exemption period had lapsed.

== Background ==
Congress established the Renewable Fuel Standard program as part of the Energy Policy Act of 2005 to promotion the production of renewable fuels. The program, managed by the Environmental Protection Agency (EPA), requires oil refineries to blend in renewable fuels, such as ethanol, into their products produced from fossil fuels. The amount to blend increased each year. As the program progressed, Congress recognized that the blending requirements created potentially disproportionate economic hardships for smaller refineries, those that produced less than 75,000 barrels per year, and created a temporary exemption in the Energy Independence and Security Act of 2007 for smaller refineries lasting through 2010. Congress instructed the Department of Energy (DOE) to study if there were disproportionate impacts of this blending requirements on the smaller refineries from which then the EPA could then grant extensions to the original exemption for smaller refiners. DOE did conclude that such hardships did exist, leading the EPA to begin issuing extensions of the original exemption, requiring the refinery to annually reapply for further extensions.

The case at hand involves three small refineries who had either failed to file for an extension in 2011, or failed to renew their extension with the EPA: HollyFrontier Woods Cross Refining LLC, HollyFrontier Cheyenne Refining LLC, and Wynnewood Refining Company. After their exemption period has expired, the three refineries separately sought a new extension to the exemption from the EPA, which the EPA granted. As more exemptions were being passed during the Trump administration, the EPA's decisions to allow for these three refineries to have disrupted extended exemptions was challenged in court by several renewable fuels associations. The associations argued that the congressional language around the Renewable Fuels Program meant that once a small refinery's exemption extension had expired, the exemption could no longer be prolonged. The refineries argued that the language of the law suggested an extension may be applied for "at any time", and did not require a continuous exemption period. The consolidated suit was brought directly to the Tenth Circuit, where the court overturned the EPA's decision, stating the agency exceeded its authority, and agreed with the renewable fuel associations' assertion that by interpretation of "extension", there had to be an exemption to extend in place already.

== Supreme Court ==
The refineries petitioned to the Supreme Court to review the Tenth Circuit's ruling, and the case was granted certiorari in January 2021. Oral hearing were held on April 27, 2021.

The Court issued its decision on June 25, 2021. In a 6–3 decision, the Supreme Court reversed the Tenth Circuit's ruling, and concluded a refinery that had allowed their exemption period to lapse can still apply to extend to re-continue the exemption period. Justice Neil Gorsuch wrote the majority opinion joined by Chief Justice John Roberts and Justices Clarence Thomas, Samuel Alito, Stephen Breyer, and Brett Kavanaugh joined. Gorsuch wrote on the majority's statutory interpretation of the congressional language used to reach this decision. First, Gorsuch stated that Congress had not defined "extension" in context of the Renewable Fuels Program, so they turned to the word's ordinary meaning, and that if Congress wanted a more restrictive meaning of "extension", they would have included such language in the law. Gorsuch wrote that their interpretation was "entirely natural -- and consistent with ordinary usage -- to seek an 'extension' of time even after some lapse," similar to seeking "an extension for a term paper after the deadline has passed." Second, the majority had considered the arguments put forth by the associates as to why an alternative interpretation could be read into the passed congressional language, but deemed that if that was the intent that Congress had, there was language that should have been included in the bill to indicate that. Gorsuch wrote that nothing in the law "commands a continuity requirement" as the associations asserted. Finally, Gorsuch relied on the Chevron deference in that in absence of other standing language from Congress, that the EPA's interpretation of the congressional language have priority.

Justice Amy Coney Barrett wrote a dissent joined by Sonia Sotomayor and Elena Kagan. Barrett argued that the majority's interpretation of the ordinary meaning of "extension" was incorrect, and that it was implied that this required the continuous exemption period to be in place to extend.
