= Mckesson v. Doe =

- Supreme Court of the United States

Decided November 2, 2020
- Full case name: DeRay Mckesson v. John Doe
- Docket no.: 19-1108
- Citations: 592 U.S. 1 (more) 141 S.Ct. 48

Case history
- Prior: dismissed for failure to state a claim, and motion to amend denied, 272 F.Supp.3d. 841 (M.D. La. 2017); dismissal reversed, 922 F.3d 604 (5th Cir. 2019); prior opinion withdrawn, new opinion substituted, 935 F.3d 253 (2019); prior opinion withdrawn, new opinion substituted, 945 F.3d 818 (2019); en banc rehearing denied, 947 F.3d 874 (5th Cir. 2020)
- Subsequent: questions of state law certified to the Louisiana Supreme Court, (5th Cir. 2021)

Holding
- Under the facts of this case, the state supreme court should resolve uncertain state tort law before federal courts decide whether applying that law would violate the First Amendment.

Court membership
- Chief Justice John Roberts Associate Justices Clarence Thomas · Stephen Breyer; Samuel Alito · Sonia Sotomayor; Elena Kagan · Neil Gorsuch; Brett Kavanaugh · Amy Coney Barrett

Case opinions
- Per curiam
- Dissent: Thomas
- Barrett took no part in the consideration or decision of the case.

Mckesson v. Doe, 592 U.S. 1 (2020), was a decision by the U.S. Supreme Court that temporarily halted a lawsuit by a police officer against an activist associated with the Black Lives Matter movement and instructed the lower federal court (the Court of Appeals for the Fifth Circuit) to seek clarification of state law from the Louisiana Supreme Court. At issue was whether the activist, DeRay Mckesson, could be liable under Louisiana tort law for injuries caused by other people at a protest. Mckesson had argued that the First Amendment's protection of freedom of assembly should block the lawsuit entirely. The Court's decision to instead redirect the tort law issue to the Louisiana Supreme Court means that the constitutional question was delayed or avoided.

== Background ==
In July 2016, the shooting of Alton Sterling by police led to intense protests in Baton Rouge. DeRay Mckesson, an early organizer of the Black Lives Matter movement, participated in these protests and was among over 100 people arrested by Baton Rouge police. The protests included some violent moments, the worst of which was the ambush shooting of six police officers by a man named Gavin Long on July 17. At one protest where Mckesson was present, which blocked a highway in front of the Baton Rouge Police Department headquarters, some protesters took to throwing objects at police, possibly including water bottles, rocks, or pieces of concrete. One of the thrown objects struck and injured an officer, identified in the lawsuit only as "John Doe." His injuries included brain injuries, jaw injuries, and missing teeth.

One of the officers shot by Gavin Long would sue Mckesson and other organizers of the Black Lives Matter movement. Still, that case, titled Smith v. Mckesson, would be dismissed, and the dismissal upheld by the Fifth Circuit in an unpublished (i.e., not precedential) opinion.

== Case in lower courts ==
=== District Court ===
Officer "John Doe" sued Mckesson and Black Lives Matter in federal court, arguing that Mckesson was "in charge of the protests" and was therefore responsible for the actions of the protestors. Mckesson argued that the precedent set in NAACP v. Claiborne Hardware (a 1982 case that limited the liability of protest organizers) meant the case should be dismissed. Judge Brian Jackson agreed with Mckesson:

. . .the Complaint fails to state a plausible claim for relief against Mckesson and it names as a Defendant a social movement . . ."# BlackLivesMatter" — a hashtag — [cannot] be sued. . .

— Doe v. Mckesson, 272 F. Supp. 3d 841 (M.D. La 2017) (Judge Jackson, emphasis in original)

=== Fifth Circuit Court of Appeals ===
==== Majority opinion ====
The officer appealed, however, and a panel of the Court of Appeals reversed the dismissal. The Court noted that, in his complaint, the officer asserted that Mckesson "incited the violence on behalf of [Black Lives Matter]," and specifically led the protesters to block the highway. The rules of procedure require a federal court of appeals not to "affirm dismissal of a claim unless the plaintiff can prove no set of facts in support of his claim that would entitle him to relief." The Court decided that it was plausible, gives the officer's allegations, that Mckesson "'knew or should have known' that the demonstration would turn violent," in part because the protest blocked a highway, which violated Louisiana state law, and this "intentional lawlessness" meant a confrontation with police was likely.

The Court of Appeals also said the district judge was wrong to dismiss on First Amendment grounds. If Mckesson had "directed. . .specific tortious activity," the First Amendment would not protect him from liability for that activity. The Court rejected Mckesson's argument that this case was trying to hold him accountable for someone else's activity:

We perceive no constitutional issue with Mckesson being held liable for injuries caused by a combination of his negligent conduct and the violent actions of another that were foreseeable as a result of that negligent conduct. The permissibility of such liability is a standard aspect of state law. . .There is no indication in Claiborne Hardware or subsequent decisions that the Supreme Court intended to restructure state tort law by eliminating this principle of negligence liability.

— Doe v. Mckesson, 945 F.3d at 829 (Judge E. Grady Jolly, writing for the majority)

The Court did uphold the dismissal of Black Lives Matter as a party, agreeing that it was a social movement and could not be a defendant in a lawsuit.

==== Dissent ====
After initially agreeing with the majority, Judge Don Willett switched his vote to a dissenting vote. Although he agreed that BLM could not be a defendant, he argued two points in dissent: first, it was unclear whether Mckesson could be liable under Louisiana tort law, and that question should be certified to the Louisiana Supreme Court. A federal court like the Fifth Circuit could apply state law but did not have the authority to make new interpretations. The proper thing to do was ask the state supreme court, which did. Second, Judge Willett could not see any plausible way that Mckesson's speech was not protected by the First Amendment:

Just as there is no "hate speech" exception to the First Amendment, "negligent" speech is also constitutionally protected. And under Claiborne Hardware (and a wealth of precedent since), raucous public protest— even "impassioned" and "emotionally charged" appeals for the use of force—is protected unless intended to, and likely to, spark immediate violence.

— Doe v. Mckesson, 945 F.3d. at 840 (Judge Willett, concurring in part and dissenting in part)

Appeal

Mckesson requested an en banc rehearing by the Fifth Circuit, which was denied with a deadlocked 8-8 vote. Mckesson then appealed to the U.S. Supreme Court.

== Decision of the Supreme Court ==
In a per curiam decision that was only five pages long, issued without hearing oral arguments, the U.S. Supreme Court decided that the case should go to the Louisiana Supreme Court for clarification of state tort law:

The novelty of the claim at issue here only underscores that "[w]arnings against premature adjudication of constitutional questions bear heightened attention when a federal court is asked to invalidate a State's law." The Louisiana Supreme Court, to be sure, may announce the same duty as the Fifth Circuit. But under the unusual circumstances we confront here, we conclude that the Fifth Circuit should not have ventured into so uncertain an area of tort law—one laden with value judgments and fraught with implications for First Amendment rights— without first seeking guidance on potentially controlling Louisiana law from the Louisiana Supreme Court. We express no opinion on the propriety of the Fifth Circuit certifying or resolving on its own any other issues of state law that the parties may raise on remand.

— Mckesson v. Doe, 592 U.S. 1, 141 S.Ct. 48 (2020) (per curiam)

Justice Thomas dissented, but did not write an opinion. Justice Barrett did not participate, having joined the court too recently.

== Subsequent litigation ==
In June 2021, on remand, the Fifth Circuit did as the Supreme Court directed and certified the question of tort liability to the Louisiana Supreme Court. It also noted that, since its last hearing, commentary by law professor Eugene Volokh had brought a new legal issue to its attention, namely Louisiana's "Professional Rescuer's Doctrine." This doctrine stated that emergency-response professionals, like firefighters and police, assume the risks of injury while working, and can't sue for such injuries. As such, two questions were certified to the Louisiana Supreme Court:

1. Whether Louisiana law recognizes a duty, under the facts alleged in the complaint, or otherwise, not to negligently precipitate the crime of a third party?
2. Assuming Mckesson could otherwise be held liable for a breach of duty owed to Officer Doe, whether Louisiana’s Professional Rescuer’s Doctrine bars recovery under the facts alleged in the complaint?

The Louisiana Supreme Court accepted the certified questions and, on March 25, 2022, issued its opinion answering “yes” and “no” respectively.

== See also ==
- NAACP v. Claiborne Hardware Co.
- DeRay Mckesson
- Black Lives Matter
