= Florida v. Georgia (2018) =

- Supreme Court of the United States

Argued January 8, 2018 Decided June 27, 2018
- Full case name: Florida v. Georgia
- Docket no.: 22O142
- Citations: 585 U.S. 803 (more) 138 S. Ct. 2502; 201 L. Ed. 2d 871
- Argument: Oral argument

Holding
- Florida made a legally sufficient showing as to the possibility of fashioning an effective remedial decree equitably apportioning the water of the ACF basin.

Court membership
- Chief Justice John Roberts Associate Justices Anthony Kennedy · Clarence Thomas; Ruth Bader Ginsburg · Stephen Breyer; Samuel Alito · Sonia Sotomayor; Elena Kagan · Neil Gorsuch

Case opinions
- Majority: Breyer, joined by Roberts, Kennedy, Ginsburg, Sotomayor
- Dissent: Thomas, joined by Alito, Kagan, Gorsuch

Florida v. Georgia, 585 U.S. 803 (2018), was a decision by the Supreme Court of the United States in an original jurisdiction case. It involves a long-running dispute over waters within the ACF River Basin, running from the north Georgia mountains through metro Atlanta to the Florida panhandle, which is managed by the United States Army Corps of Engineers. Waters in the area have been stressed by the population growth of Atlanta over previous decades. The immediate case stemmed from droughts in 2011 and 2012 that caused economic damage to Florida due to lower water flows from the ACF River Basin into the panhandle, impacting its seafood production; Florida sought relief to have more water allocated towards them from the ACF by placing a water allocation cap on Georgia. The Supreme Court assigned a special master to review Florida's complaint, but ultimately found in 2016 that Florida had not fully demonstrated the need for more allocation. Florida challenged this determination to the Supreme Court. On June 27, 2018, the Supreme Court ruled 5–4 that the special master had not properly considered Florida's argument and remanded the case to be reheard and reviewed.

Subsequently, the court replaced the special master, who later ruled against Florida in the dispute. Florida challenged the conclusions of the special master's report, but the Supreme Court overruled Florida's exceptions and unanimously dismissed the case in Florida v. Georgia, 592 U.S. ___ (2021).

== Background ==
The case involves the Apalachicola-Chattahoochee-Flint (ACF) River Basin, which includes three major rivers in the southeast United States. The Chattahoochee River runs from the southern end of the Appalachian Mountains in northern Georgia and runs south-southwest and towards the Gulf of Mexico; it forms the state border between Georgia and Alabama. The Flint River forms from groundwater seepage in northern Georgia, and also runs south-southwest until it meets with the Chattahoochee at the southern edge of both Georgia and Alabama. The combined rivers become the Apalachicola River which then crosses Florida's panhandle and empties into Apalachicola Bay, an estuary abutting the Gulf. Besides serving as water sources for various municipal water systems, the ACF River Basin also provides significant quantities of water for agricultural irrigation, and numerous wildlife species reside along the rivers, particularly within the Bay.

With approval from Congress, the United States Army Corps of Engineers completed Buford Dam on the Chattahoochee in Georgia in the 1950s that created the reservoir Lake Lanier. This was intended to help manage the water flow along the Chattahoochee so that it could be used for both hydroelectric power and for water-bourne transport through a series of locks, as well as for flood control.

In the second half of the 20th century, Atlanta saw a significant boost in population growth, stressing its water supply that was also coupled with droughts. The Corps, the United States Environmental Protection Agency, the state of Georgia, and the Atlanta Regional Commission conducted a study in 1989 to determine that to meet Atlanta's water needs in the future, the city could be offered the right to purchase some of the water stored in Lake Lanier as long as the city and state paid for the costs of constructing and operating the offtake from the lake to metro Atlanta. The Corps determined that there was no significant environmental impact of this approach.

=== Prior litigation ===
In 1990, Alabama filed a lawsuit to stop the Corps from implementing this plan, and other suits followed from Georgia and Florida. These suits were ultimately combined into a signal case designed to examine two questions: whether the Corps had the authority to grant water usage rights, and whether the plan ignored elements of the Endangered Species Act of 1973. By 1992, the parties had come to a memorandum of understanding (MOU) that would stay the lawsuit, with the Corps holding off on implementing their water supply plan with Atlanta, while a comprehensive water usage study of both the ACF and the neighboring Alabama-Coosa-Tallapoosa (ACT) River Basin was conducted. The MOU also included allowance for the Corps to provide reasonable quantities water to the metro Atlanta area to meet their needs while the study was in progress.

By 1997, the study had yet to be completed, but Congress ratified two interstate compacts, the ACF and the ACT Compact, which allowed the involved states to enter into negotiations to derives formulas for how the water was to be allocated from these two basins. As with the 1992 MOU, the ACF Compact allowed the Corps to continue to provide water to the metro Atlanta area as it saw needed while the negotiations progressed. The states attempted to reach an agreement in the compact, but by 2003, these negotiations for the ACF Compact had failed, and 2004 for the ACT Compact, and both compacts were dissolved.

Alabama restarted its 1990 lawsuit following the dissolution of the ACF Compact. This ended up splintering into eight different cases at state and federal level, but were ultimately condensed into two cases. The United States Court of Appeals for the Eleventh Circuit ruled in 2011 that the Corps did have the right to allocate waters from Lake Lanier to Atlanta, as Congress had authorized this use in the legislation used to approve of the project. Within the year, the Corps made a preliminary decision that it could offer 705 million gallons per day from Lanier to Atlanta to be added to its Master Manual for the ACF Basin, but that decision was pending an environmental impact statement. Alabama petitioned the case to the Supreme Court but they declined to hear the challenge, effectively ending decades of litigation.

== Case history ==
In 2011 and 2012, droughts in the southeast states led to lower water levels in the ACF rivers, increasing the salinity of the waters in Apalachicola Bay, and caused a collapse of Florida's oyster industry. In 2013, Florida filed a motion for leave with the Supreme Court, issuing a complaint for equitable apportionment and injunctive relief against the state of Georgia. Florida claimed that the increased offtake of water by Georgia had caused "serious harm" to the ecosystem, and demanded that Atlanta cap its water offtake from the Chattahoochee to the 1992 levels (at the time of the MOU). The Court accepted the motion, and assigned Ralph I. Lancaster, Jr. as a special master to review the complaint. Lancaster performed discovery and pre-trial hearings from 2014 to 2016, and held a six-week trial in late 2016. He provided the Court with his report in February 2017, rejecting Florida's complaint towards Georgia. Lancaster had agreed that there was environmental impact from lower water levels, he stated that Florida had “not proven by clear and convincing evidence" that a water offtake cap would improve water availability during drought periods. Additionally, as Florida had not included the Army Corps within its complaint, they could not seek the required relief.

In May 2017, the Corps updated its Master Manual to include the Atlanta water usage, with notice that should the Supreme Court issue a ruling in the case, they would update the Manual appropriately. Based on this new information, Florida filed their exceptions to Lancaster's report, specifically taking objection that they had to show clear evidence that capping Atlanta's water support would provide the redress they requested.

== At the Supreme Court ==
Oral arguments took place on January 8, 2018.

The Court issued its ruling on June 27, 2018. In a 5–4 decision, the Court found that the Special Master used too strict a standard to the case presented by Florida, and ordered the case be remanded to be reheard to take appropriate considerations for Florida's arguments.

== Subsequent actions ==
Florida v. Georgia
- Supreme Court of the United States

Argued February 22, 2021 Decided April 1, 2021
- Full case name: Florida v. Georgia
- Docket no.: 22O142
- Citations: 592 U.S. ___ (more)
- Argument: Oral argument

Holding
- Florida's exceptions to the Special Master's Report are overruled, and the case is dismissed.

Court membership
- Chief Justice John Roberts Associate Justices Clarence Thomas · Stephen Breyer; Samuel Alito · Sonia Sotomayor; Elena Kagan · Neil Gorsuch; Brett Kavanaugh · Amy Coney Barrett

Case opinion
- Majority: Barrett, joined by unanimous

Following the ruling, on August 9, 2018, the Supreme Court discharged Special Master Lancaster with the thanks of the court and replaced him with Judge Paul Joseph Kelly Jr. of the Tenth Circuit. Kelly discussed if the case needed additional discovery with the parties, but all agreed that the current documented history of the case should be sufficient, so Kelly, by January 2019, sought final statements and conclusions from the parties to review, with responses and counter-statements made by March 2019. In December 2019, the special master found in favor of Georgia. In his 96-page report to the Supreme Court, Kelly recommended denying Florida's request for a decree allocating the water between the two states. He found that Florida failed to show that Georgia's use of water was excessive or that the harm to their domestic oyster industry was caused by Georgia's activity. He also found that the benefit to Florida would not outweigh the harm to Georgia under the doctrine of equitable apportionment.

Florida dispute the ruling of the Special Master in a new challenge to the Court. The Court heard oral arguments to this case on February 22, 2021 and issued a unanimous ruling on April 1, 2021, overruling the exemptions that Florida had with the Special Master's findings and dismissing their case (Florida v. Georgia, 592 U.S. ___ (2001)) The unanimous opinion, written by Justice Amy Coney Barrett, stated that Florida failed to prove out its exceptions it had on the Special Master ruling, and that "Considering the record as a whole, Florida has not shown that it is 'highly probable' that Georgia's alleged overconsumption played more than a trivial role in the collapse of Florida's oyster fisheries."
