= United States v. Briggs (2020) =

United States Supreme Court case

- Supreme Court of the United States

Argued October 13, 2020 Decided December 10, 2020
- Full case name: United States v. Michael Briggs
- Docket no.: 19-108
- Citations: 592 U.S. ___ (more) 141 S. Ct. 467
- Argument: Oral argument

Case history
- Prior: 78 M.J. 289 (C.A.A.F. 2019); cert. granted, 140 S. Ct. 519 (2019)

Holding
- Capital crimes do not have a statute of limitations under the UCMJ, and rape is a capital crime under the UCMJ.

Court membership
- Chief Justice John Roberts Associate Justices Clarence Thomas · Stephen Breyer; Samuel Alito · Sonia Sotomayor; Elena Kagan · Neil Gorsuch; Brett Kavanaugh · Amy Coney Barrett

Case opinions
- Majority: Alito, joined by Roberts, Thomas, Breyer, Sotomayor, Kagan, Gorsuch, Kavanaugh
- Concurrence: Gorsuch
- Barrett took no part in the consideration or decision of the case.

United States v. Briggs, 592 U.S. ___ (2020), was a United States Supreme Court case involving whether the United States Court of Appeals for the Armed Forces (CAAF) erred in ruling that the Uniform Code of Military Justice allows prosecution of a rape committed between 1986 and 2006 only if it was discovered and charged within five years. The Court, with the exception of Justice Amy Coney Barrett who did not participate on the case, ruled unanimously that under the Uniform Code, such crimes that are "punishable by death" under the Code do not have a statute of limitations unlike similar civilian crimes.

This case was considered notable due to its implications on the issue of sexual assault in the United States military and the military's ability to address these types of cases. The case was consolidated with another, similar case called United States v. Collins (No. 19-184).

== Background ==
=== Legal environment ===
Under United States federal law, there is a separation between military and civilian law. Congress enacted the Uniform Code of Military Justice (UCMJ) to create a separate, parallel legal system for the military, which is enforced by its own judicial system. In general, under the UCMJ crimes prosecuted under military law must be charged within five years due to the statute of limitations, with the primary exception being the crime of desertion or being absent without leave during a time of war. In 1986, Congress passed a law to exempt certain capital offenses (those punishable by the death penalty) from the statute of limitations as well. At the time of the 1986 amendment, capital offenses included rape. However, in 1977, the Supreme Court ruled in Coker v. Georgia that imposing the death penalty for rape violated the Eighth Amendment. Congress subsequently amended the UCMJ again to clarify that there was no statute of limitations for rape under the National Defense Authorization Act for fiscal year 2006. This created an ambiguity in the law as it relates to rape and sexual assault cases that took place between 1986 (when Congress initially removed the statute of limitations for all capital offenses) and 2006 (when Congress clarified that the statute of limitations did not apply to rape even though rape was no longer a capital offense). This was resolved by the Court of Appeals for the Armed Forces in their 2018 ruling United States v. Mangahas (No. 17-0434). In Mangahas, the Court of Appeals for the Armed Forces ruled that, because rape was not a capital offense since 1977 due to Coker v. Georgia and because Congress did not pass a law separately excluding rape from the general statute of limitations, the general 5-year statute of limitations would apply to all rape cases stemming from incidents that took place before 2006. As a result of this ruling, several pending rape investigations were suspended and cases that were on appeal were dismissed.

=== Case history ===
In 2005, Briggs, a lieutenant colonel in the United States Air Force, raped a fellow airman who was assigned to the life support equipment section. At the time, the victim did not report the rape to law enforcement but did tell people she knew about it. In 2013, the victim reported the incident to law enforcement. Working with the Air Force criminal investigators, she contacted Briggs to discuss the assault and recorded him explicitly confessing to the rape. Briggs was tried before a military judge at Spangdahlem Air Base and, in August 2014, he was convicted and sentenced to five months of confinement as well as a discharge from the Air Force and letter of reprimand.

== In lower courts ==
Briggs appealed his conviction and sentence to the United States Air Force Court of Criminal Appeals (AFCCA) in 2015. In his appeal, he raised several potential issues, including the statute of limitations for rape. However, the AFCCA rejected his appeal in June 2016, in part due to the fact that he failed to raise the statute of limitations issue during his trial. Briggs then appealed again, this time to the United States Court of Appeals for the Armed Forces (CAAF). In an opinion published in 2019 (No. 16-0711), CAAF ruled in favor of Briggs, dismissing the case against him. They cited the Mangahas decision, ruling that the 5-year statute of limitations applied to Briggs' case since the incident took place in 2005 (before Congress enacted the amendments removing the statute of limitations). According to the court, the statute of limitations expired in 2010 and thus the 2013 prosecution was not valid. This time, the government appealed the decision to the Supreme Court.

== Supreme Court ==
The Supreme Court granted the government's petition for a writ of certiorari on November 15, 2019, and consolidated the Briggs case with two other, similar cases for one hour of oral argument scheduled for March 2020. However, this case was one of several that were pushed into the 2020–21 term due to the impact of the COVID-19 pandemic, and oral hearings were held instead on October 13, 2020; this was prior to Justice Amy Coney Barrett's confirmation to the Court to replace Ruth Bader Ginsburg, and thus Barrett took no part in this matter.

The Supreme Court issued its decision on December 10, 2020, reversing the Court of Appeals for the Armed Forces' decision in the trials of the three men and remanding the case. The unanimous opinion of the Court was written by Justice Samuel Alito. Alito wrote that in the interpretation of the law, where for crimes "punishable by death", the government's argument that this applicated to the Uniform Code was more pervasive than Briggs' assertion this was the application to civilian law. Justice Neil Gorsuch wrote a concurring opinion, and argued the Supreme Court did not have jurisdiction over cases from the CAAF.
