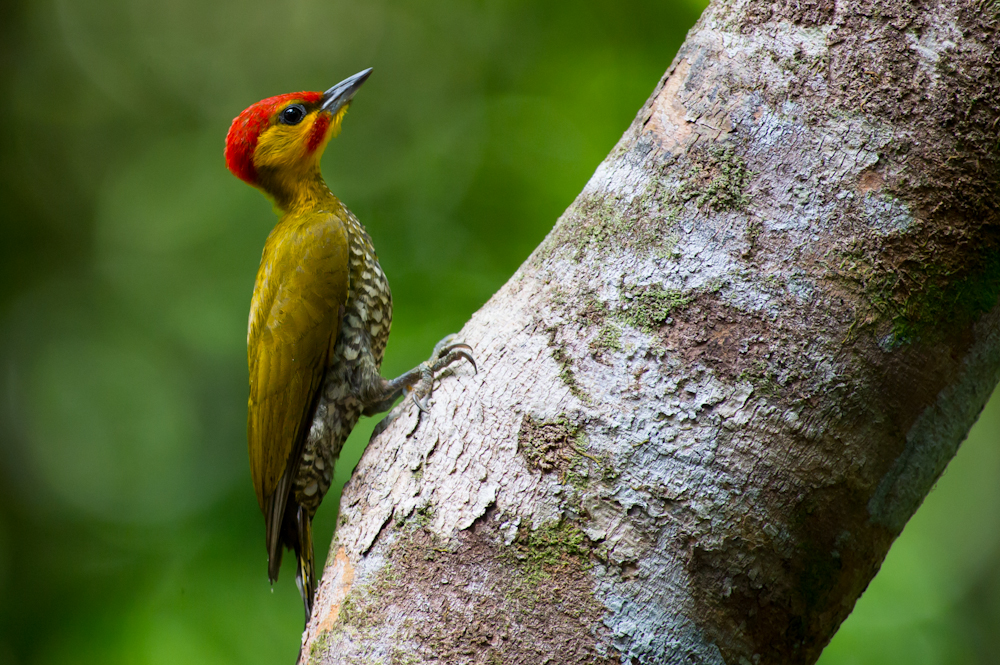

Conservation status
- Least Concern (IUCN 3.1)

Scientific classification
- Kingdom: Animalia
- Phylum: Chordata
- Class: Aves
- Order: Piciformes
- Family: Picidae
- Genus: Piculus
- Species: P. flavigula

Binomial name
- Piculus flavigula (Boddaert, 1783)

= Yellow-throated woodpecker =

Species of bird

The yellow-throated woodpecker (Piculus flavigula) is a species of bird in subfamily Picinae of the woodpecker family Picidae. It is found in Bolivia, Brazil, Colombia, Ecuador, French Guiana, Guyana, Peru, Suriname and Venezuela.

== Taxonomy and systematics ==
The yellow-throated woodpecker was described by the French polymath Georges-Louis Leclerc, Comte de Buffon in 1780 in his Histoire Naturelle des Oiseaux from a specimen collected in French Guiana. The bird was also illustrated in a hand-colored plate engraved by François-Nicolas Martinet in the Planches Enluminées D'Histoire Naturelle, which was produced under the supervision of Edme-Louis Daubenton to accompany Buffon's text. Neither the plate caption nor Buffon's description included a scientific name, but in 1783 the Dutch naturalist Pieter Boddaert coined the binomial name Picus flavigula in his catalogue of the Planches Enluminées. The yellow-throated woodpecker is now placed in the genus Piculus that was introduced by the German naturalist Johann Baptist von Spix in 1824. The generic name is a diminutive of the Latin word Picus meaning "woodpecker". The specific epithet flavigula combines the Latin flavus meaning "yellow" and gula meaning "throat".

Three subspecies of yellow-throated woodpecker are recognized:

- P. f. flavigula (Boddaert, 1783)
- P. f. magnus (Cherrie & Reichenberger, 1921)
- P. f. erythropis (Vieillot, 1818)

Subspecies P. f. erythropis has significant size and plumage differences from the other two. It has in the past been treated as a separate species and may again be separated as one.

== Description ==
The yellow-throated woodpecker is 19 to 20 cm (7.5 to 7.9 in) long and weighs 44 to 63 g (1.6 to 2.2 oz). Males and females have the same plumage except on their heads. Males of the nominate subspecies P. f. flavigula are red from forehead to hindneck and on the malar (cheek); the former area has black feather bases showing through. The rest of the head including the chin and throat is bright golden-yellow. The female has red only on the nape and the rest of its crown is golden-yellow with green feather tips; its head is otherwise like the male's. Nominate adults have yellowish green upperparts that are brighter on the shoulders and back. Their flight feathers are mostly brownish black with cinnamon patches on the inner webs. Their tail is black with greenish edges on the feathers. Their underparts are green; the breast feathers have whitish centers and black tips while the belly and undertail coverts appear barred or scaly with black. Their shortish beak is black with a paler base, their iris brown, and the legs dark green-gray. Juveniles have duller and greener upperparts than adults and a yellow throat but are otherwise darker on their underparts. Males may have a small red patch on the crown and females have an entirely green crown.

Subspecies P. f. magnus is identical to the nominate except that the male does not have a red malar area. P. f. erythropis differs significantly from the other two subspecies. It is smaller. Males have more extensive red on the crown, and the red of its malar region extends around under the chin and throat as well. Females have a golden-yellow forecrown, malar, and throat, but with some red on the throat. Both sexes' underparts appear more barred than spotted or scaly.

== Distribution and habitat ==
The subspecies of yellow-throated woodpecker are found thus:

- P. f. flavigula (Boddaert, 1783), extreme eastern Colombia east through southern Venezuela and the Guianas and south into northern Brazil
- P. f. magnus (Cherrie & Reichenberger, 1921), southeastern Colombia south through eastern Ecuador and eastern Peru into northern Bolivia and east into western Brazil
- P. f. erythropis (Vieillot, 1818), separately in eastern Brazil's Pernambuco state and between the states of Bahia and São Paulo in southeastern Brazil

The yellow-throated woodpecker inhabits the interior and edges of mature terra firme and várzea forests. Subspecies P. f. erythropis is mostly found in drier caatinga habitat. It is a species of the lowlands, ranging in elevation from sea level in the Guianas and Brazil to 300 m (1,000 ft) in Ecuador and 500 m (1,600 ft) in Peru.

== Behavior ==
=== Movement ===
The yellow-throated woodpecker is a year-round resident throughout its range.

=== Feeding ===
The yellow-throated woodpecker forages from the forest's middle levels to the canopy, by itself, in pairs, or as part of a mixed species feeding flock. It seeks food vigorously by pecking, hammering, and flaking off bark; it less often probes. Its diet has not been studied but is known to include ants.

=== Breeding ===
The yellow-throated woodpecker's breeding season varies geographically, including November in Colombia and Venezuela, May to July in the Guianas, and August to December in Amazonian Brazil to Bolivia. Its excavates a nest cavity, usually in a branch or trunk stub fairly near the ground and rarely as high as 15 m (50 ft). The clutch size, incubation period, time to fledging, and details of parental care are not known.

=== Vocalization ===
The yellow-throated woodpecker's song is a "series of 1-7 high, hoarse, angry-sounding 'vraah' notes." It also makes "[f]ar-carrying hissing 'queea' or 'shaa, gheh' or 'shreeyr', sometimes doubled" and a "rattle-type call 'kee' in series".

== Status ==
The IUCN has assessed the yellow-throated woodpecker as being of Least Concern. It has an extremely large range but its population size is not known and is believed to be decreasing. No immediate threats have been identified. It is considered rather common except in Ecuador and Peru where it is thought rare to uncommon. It occurs in protected areas in several countries.
