= Carl Binger =

American psychiatrist

- Born: Carl Alfred Lanning Binger; 1889
- Died: 1976 (age 87)
- Education: M.D. Harvard Medical School
- Occupation: Psychiatrist
- Parent(s): Frances Newgass Binger; Gustav Binger
- Family: Elsie Naumburg (sister); Walter D. Binger (brother)

Carl Binger (1889–1976), AKA Carl A. L. Binger, was a 20th-century American psychiatrist. He wrote books and articles on a wide range of topics, including medicine and psychiatry, and testified in the trial of Alger Hiss.

== Background ==
Carl Alfred Lanning Binger was born in 1889, the son of Frances (née Newgass) and Gustav Binger. He had three siblings: Elsie Naumburg, Robert Binger, and Walter D. Binger. He graduated from Harvard Medical School in 1914.

== Career ==
In 1943, E. B. White consulted Binger, a pioneer in the field of psychosomatic medicine, during a nervous breakdown in the spring of that year.

In 1946, Binger was certified as a psychiatrist after deferral for insufficient training.

In the summer of 1951 he resigned his position of directing the two-million-dollar-endowed Mary Conover Mellon Foundation out of concern for the "sexual development of undergraduates in an atmosphere of supervision by matriarchy."

== Hiss Case ==
Binger's wife was a college classmate of Alger Hiss's future wife Priscilla at Bryn Mawr College. Binger himself was a friend of Louis Weiss, brother of Carol Weiss King. King was a member of the International Juridical Association, of which Hiss (and several others in the Ware group had been a member.

On August 17, 1948, The New York Times interviewed Binger during a conference on mental health and reported:

Professor Binger pointed to the "bugaboo of communism," which he said was now spreading a state of "neurotic anxiety" throughout the United States. Fanned largely by "big business" and by vote-getters, this "neurosis," Professor Binger added, has become confused in public minds with the "legitimate fears" of Russia and, under such conditions, he asserted, not only the people of the United States but also its leaders and policymakers are in danger of losing a rational, objective approach to world problems."

In the 1949 Alger Hiss trials, Binger served as a defense witness by analyzing Whittaker Chambers's activities, writings, and behavior during trial but without ever meeting or interviewing him. In his testimony with Hiss's lead attorney Claude Cross, the following exchange occurred:

CROSS: What is your opinion, Dr. Binger, of the mental condition of Mr. Chambers?
BINGER: I think Mr. Chambers is suffering from a condition known as psychopathic personality, which is a disorder of character, of which the outstanding features are behavior of what we call an amoral or an asocial and delinquent nature.
CROSS: Will you define for us, Doctor, what you mean by amoral and asocial?
BINGER: I mean that amoral behavior is behavior that does not take account the ordinary accepted conventions of morality; and asocial behavior is behavior which has not regard for the good of society and of individuals, and is therefore frequently destructive of both.
CROSS: Is psychopathic personality a recognized mental disease?
BINGER: It is...
CROSS: Will you tell us, Dr. Binger, what some of the symptoms of a psychopathic personality are?
BINGER: Well, they are quite variegated. They include chronic, persistent and repetitive lying; they include stealing; they include acts of deception and misrepresentations; they include alcoholism and drug addiction; abnormal sexuality; vagabondage; panhandling; inability to form stable attachments; and a tendency to make false accusations.

In his testimony with Prosecutor Thomas Francis Murphy, the following exchange occurred regarding the Pumpkin Papers:

MURPHY: You say that a man who was living on a farm in 1948, who puts pretty valuable papers in a pumpkin that he has hollowed out right by his door, is bizarre?
BINGER: I say the act is bizarre.
MURPHY: The act is bizarre?
BINGER: Because it is unusual. Perhaps there is one other example in history that you have given.
MURPHY: If, Doctor, you assume that these microfilms were previously in his house and he moved them from room to room, and that the day that he put them in the pumpkin was the day that he was going to leave his farm, and assume further that there were different people in and about the farm looking for things, wouldn't you say, Doctor, that that was a pretty good hiding place?
BINGER: It was.
MURPHY: No matter how bizarre it was?
BINGER: It certainly was a good hiding place, yes.
MURPHY: All right. As a matter of fact, don't you remember reading, Doctor, that when Benedict Arnold sold out West Point and gave the plans to Major André, do you know where he put the plans when he was caught, just up here by Tarrytown?
BINGER: No, I don't.
MURPHY: He had them in the boot of his shoe, the sole of his boot. Was that bizarre on the part of an intelligent British officer?
BINGER: No, I wouldn't say so.
MURPHY: Well, how about the mother of Moses hiding the little child in the bulrushes? Was that bizarre?
BINGER: Well, she could hardly put it in a safe deposit vault.
MURPHY: Now, Doctor, you don't tell us that all things that don't fit in safe deposit boxes are therefore bizarre, do you?
BINGER: No, I don't.
MURPHY: I am asking you, Doctor, whether the action of Moses' mother in putting the young child in the bulrushes was bizarre behavior?
BINGER: I don't know the circumstances and I wouldn't know where else she had to hide the child. If that was the only place, it certainly was not bizarre.

Summing up Binger's input to the case, John V. Fleming wrote:

The junk literary criticism was handmaid to the junk science introduced into the first trial by one of Hiss's testimonial experts, the psychiastrist Carl Binger. He was the one who without ever interviewing Chambers had attributed to him "unconscious motivation" and in the second trial assigned him to the category of "psychopathic personality"–a category he then cheerfully agreed was meaningless.

== Personal and death ==
Binger was one of the oldest friends of American journalist Walter Lippman.

== Awards, honors ==
In 1959, he was elected a Fellow of the American Academy of Arts and Sciences.

== Works ==
- "The Pressures on College Girls Today" (February 1961 Atlantic)
- Revolutionary doctor: Benjamin Rush, 1746-1813. W.W. Norton, 1966.
- The Doctor's Job. W. W. Norton, 1945.
- Personality in arterial hypertension (Psychomatic Medicine Monograph). 1945.
- More about Psychiatry. University of Chicago Press, 1949.
- The two faces of medicine: essays. W. W. Norton, 1967.
- Thomas Jefferson, a Well-tempered Mind. W. W. Norton, 1970. ISBN 0-393-01085-6.

== See also ==
- Alger Hiss

== External sources ==
- The Literary and Scientific Publications of Carl Binger (Psychosomatic Medicine. Vol. 24, issue 1. 1962. Stanley Cobb)
- Book Review of The Two Faces of Medicine (American Journal of Psychiatry. Vol. 24, no. 5. Nov. 1967.)
- Book Review of The Doctor's Job (American Journal of Public Health. Dec. 1945.)
- Binger's Worldcat identity
