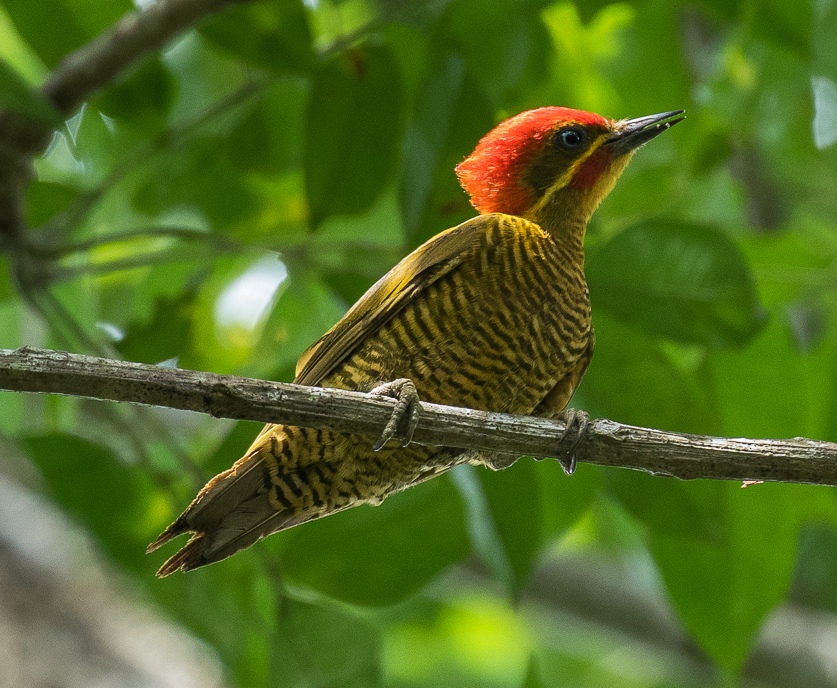
- A male golden-green woodpecker at Darién, Panama

Conservation status
- Least Concern (IUCN 3.1)

Scientific classification
- Kingdom: Animalia
- Phylum: Chordata
- Class: Aves
- Order: Piciformes
- Family: Picidae
- Genus: Piculus
- Species: P. chrysochloros

Binomial name
- Piculus chrysochloros (Vieillot, 1818)

= Golden-green woodpecker =

Species of bird

The golden-green woodpecker (Piculus chrysochloros) is a species of bird in subfamily Picinae of the woodpecker family Picidae. It is found in Panama and every mainland South American country except Chile and Uruguay.

== Taxonomy and systematics ==
The golden-green woodpecker's taxonomy is unsettled. The International Ornithological Committee (IOC) and the Clements taxonomy recognize these six subspecies:

- P. c. xanthochlorus (Sclater, P.L. & Salvin, 1875)
- P. c. capistratus (Malherbe, 1862)
- P. c. laemostictus Todd, 1937
- P. c. paraensis (Snethlage, E., 1907)
- P. c. polyzonus (Valenciennes, 1826)
- P. c. chrysochloros (Vieillot, 1818)

BirdLife International's Handbook of the Birds of the World further subdivides the golden-green woodpecker by adding the three subspecies P. c. aurosus, P. c. guianensis, and P. c. hypochryseus but does not list their originators. However, a 2013 study found that they are not "diagnosable units".

Subspecies P. c. xanthochlorus has at times been treated as a separate species.

Some authors treat the golden-green woodpecker and the yellow-browed woodpecker (P. aurulentus) as a superspecies.

This article follows the six-subspecies model.

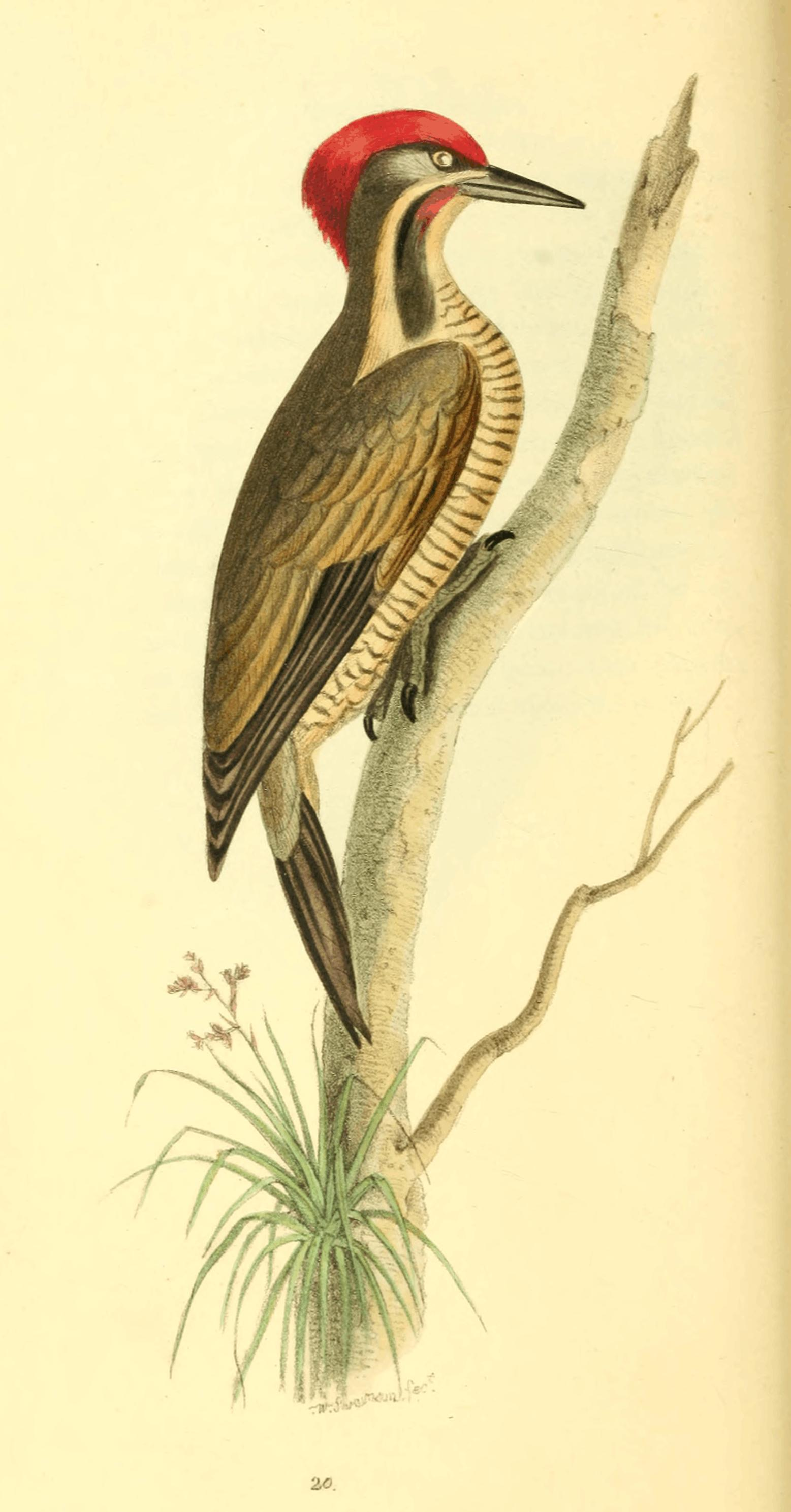
Piculus chrysochloros Swainson, 1820

== Description ==
The golden-green woodpecker is 18 to 27 cm (7.1 to 11 in) long and weighs 55 to 91 g (1.9 to 3.2 oz). Males and females have the same plumage except on their heads. Males of the nominate subspecies P. c. chrysochloros are red from forehead to nape, have olive green from the lores around the eye and onto the side of the neck, and successively a pale yellow stripe, a short red malar band, and an olive green stripe below that area. Their chin and upper throat are yellow. The nominate female has no red on its head; its forehead to nape are olive and it has an olive-brown malar area. Nominate adults have olive green upperparts. Their flight feathers are darker olive-brown and their tail dark olive-brown. Their underparts are pale yellow-buff with olive-brown bars. Their longtish beak is dark gray to blackish with a paler base, their iris white to bluish white, and the legs grayish green. Juveniles are generally duller than adults and have less well defined barring on their underparts.

Subspecies P. c. xanthochlorus is smaller and brighter yellow than the nominate, and the female has a yellow crown. P. c. capistratus is very large and a darker olive green above than the nominate, and has less red in the malar area, a barred throat, and greenish white instead of yellow buff on their underparts. P. c. paraensis is intermediate in size. Its cheek stripe, throat, and underparts' base color are cinnamon-buff. Males have a green, not red, malar, and females have a greenish yellow crown. P. c. laemostictus is large and rather dark, with a plain whitish throat. P. c. polyzonus is also large, with a pale yellow cheek stripe and throat and a yellow base color on the underparts.

== Distribution and habitat ==
The subspecies of the golden-green woodpecker are found thus:

- P. c. xanthochlorus, eastern Panama, northern Colombia, and northern Venezuela
- P. c. capistratus, from southeastern Colombia south through eastern Ecuador into northern Peru and east through the Guianas into Brazil north of the Amazon
- P. c. laemostictus, from eastern Peru and northern Bolivia east to central Brazil south of the Amazon
- P. c. paraensis, northeastern Brazil centered on Belém
- P. c. polyzonus, southeastern Brazil between the states of Bahia and Rio de Janeiro
- P. c. chrysochloros, central and southern Brazil, eastern Bolivia, western Paraguay, and northern Argentina

The golden-green woodpecker inhabits a wide variety of landscapes, most of them wooded to some degree. They include terra firme and várzea forest, rainforest, deciduous forest, and more open areas like treed savannah, pastures, and clearings. In elevation it ranges from sea level on the Atlantic coast to 450 m (1,500 ft) in northwestern Venezuela, to 650 m (2,100 ft) in southern Venezuela, to 500 m (1,600 ft) in Colombia, to 650 m (2,100 ft) in Peru, and to 600 m (2,000 ft) but usually only to 300 m (1,000 ft) in Ecuador.

== Behavior ==
=== Movement ===
The golden-green woodpecker is a year-round resident throughout its range.

=== Feeding ===
The golden-green woodpecker mostly forages in the forest's subcanopy and canopy, by itself, in pairs, or as part of a mixed species feeding flock. It commonly feeds by gleaning and also pecks and excavates to reach prey. Its diet has not been studied but is known to include ants and termites.

=== Breeding ===
The golden-green woodpecker's breeding season is not well known but appears to vary geographically. Breeding has been recorded between February and March in Colombia and in September in Argentina. It excavates its nest cavity in a tree or in the nest of arboreal insects. The clutch size, incubation period, time to fledging, and details of parental care are not known.

=== Vocalization ===
The golden-green woodpecker's song is a "series of 15 almost toneless, hoarse 'schraah' notes, sounding like a hysterically crying baby."

== Status ==
The IUCN has assessed the golden-green woodpecker as being of Least Concern. It has an extremely large range and an estimated population of at least a half million mature individuals, though the latter is believed to be decreasing. No immediate threats have been identified. It is considered from rare to "not uncommon" in different parts of its range and occurs in several protected areas. "Despite [its] large range, this species is not particularly well known."
