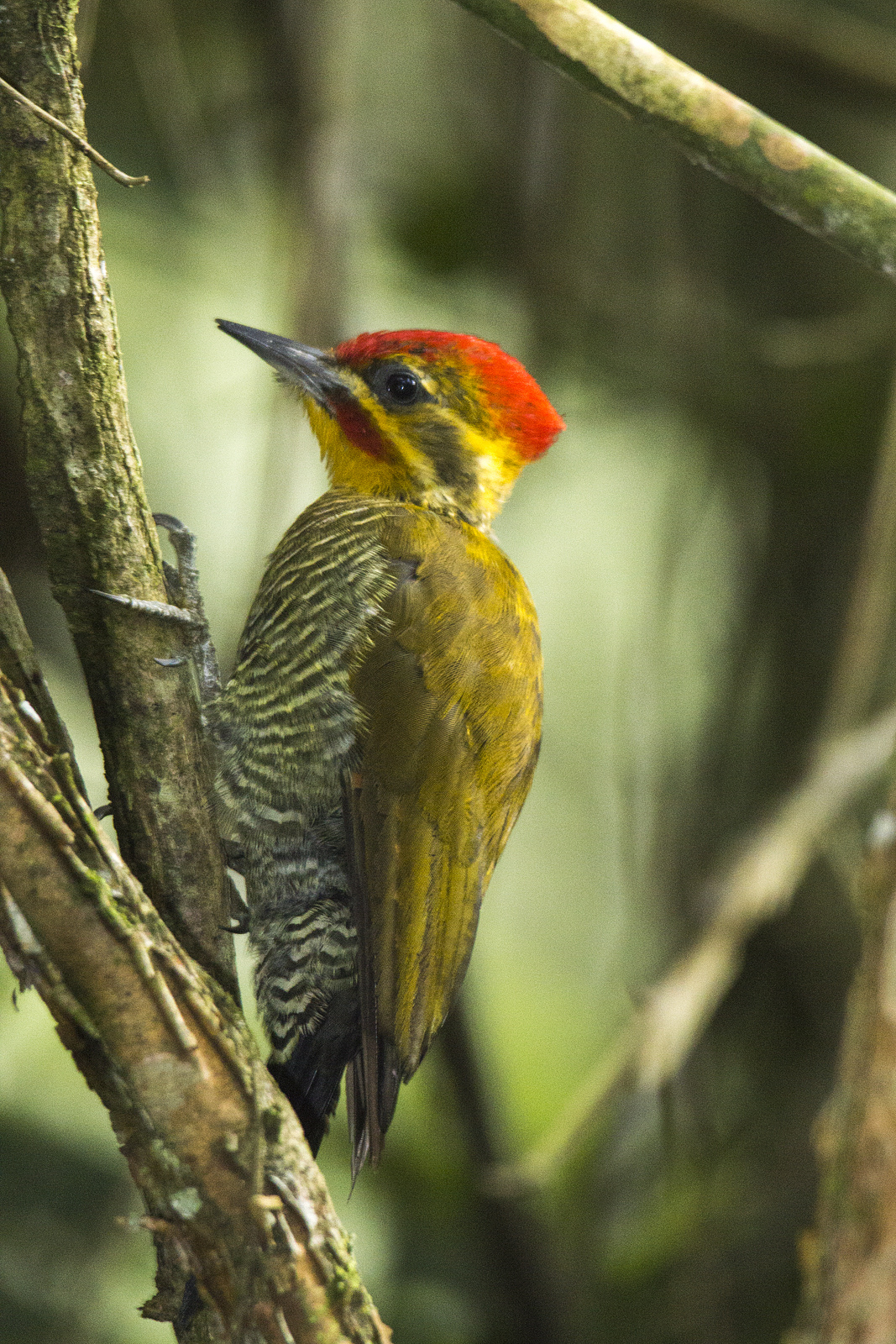
- Male in Espírito Santo State, Brazil

Conservation status
- Near Threatened (IUCN 3.1)

Scientific classification
- Kingdom: Animalia
- Phylum: Chordata
- Class: Aves
- Order: Piciformes
- Family: Picidae
- Genus: Piculus
- Species: P. aurulentus

Binomial name
- Piculus aurulentus (Temminck, 1821)

= Yellow-browed woodpecker =

Species of bird

The yellow-browed woodpecker (Piculus aurulentus), also known as the white-browed woodpecker, is a Near Threatened species of bird in the woodpecker family Picidae. It is found in Argentina, Brazil, Paraguay, and Uruguay.

== Taxonomy and systematics ==
Some authors treat the yellow-browed woodpecker and the golden-green woodpecker (P. chrysochloros) as a superspecies. The species is monotypic.

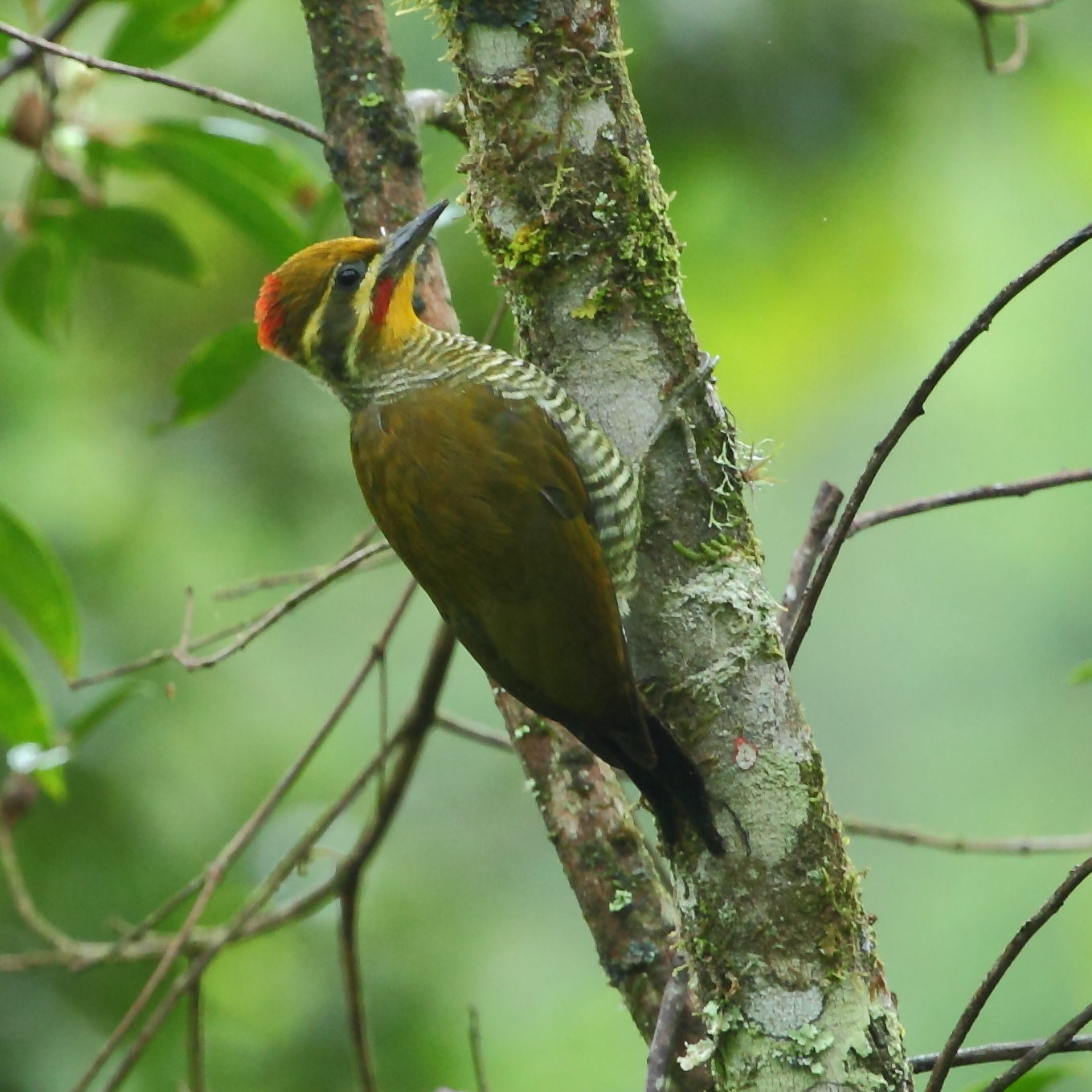
Female at Serra do Mar State Park, São Paulo State, Brazil

== Description ==
The yellow-browed woodpecker is 21 to 22 cm (8.3 to 8.7 in) long and weighs 22 to 68 g (0.78 to 2.4 oz). Males and females have the same plumage except on their heads. Males are red from forehead to nape, have a narrow yellowish white supercilium, are dark olive green around the eye and onto the side of the neck, and successively below that a pale yellow stripe and a red malar band. Their chin and throat are pale golden. The female has an olive forehead and crown and much less red at the malar. Adults have olive green upperparts. Their flight feathers are dark brown with greenish edges and dark cinnamon-rufous on the inner webs. Their tail is blackish. Their underparts are whitish with wide dark olive bars. Their medium-length beak is blackish gray with a paler base on the mandible, their iris chestnut-brown, and the legs greenish gray. Juveniles are generally duller than adults and have less well defined barring on their underparts.

== Distribution and habitat ==
The yellow-browed woodpecker is found from Brazil's São Paulo state south through eastern Paraguay and northern Uruguay into northeastern Argentina. It inhabits the interior and edges of humid mature montane forest, dense secondary forest and woodland, and humid lowland forest. In elevation it ranges between 750 and 2,000 m (2,500 and 6,600 ft) in Brazil and generally lower in the other countries.

== Behavior ==
=== Movement ===
As far as is known, the yellow-browed woodpecker is a year-round resident throughout its range.

=== Feeding ===
The yellow-browed woodpecker mostly forages in the forest's middle level, by itself or in pairs. It commonly feeds by gleaning and pecking to reach prey. Its diet has not been studied in detail but is known to include ants and their eggs.

=== Breeding ===
The yellow-browed woodpecker's breeding season is not well defined but appears to include August to November. It tends to excavate its nest cavity high in a tree.The clutch size, incubation period, time to fledging, and details of parental care are not known.

=== Vocal and non-vocal sounds ===
The yellow-browed woodpecker's song is a "slow or hurried series of 7-15 high 'wuh' notes." It drums with "rapid, regular rolls."

== Status ==
The IUCN has assessed the yellow-browed woodpecker as Near Threatened. It has a somewhat restricted range and an unknown population size that is believed to be decreasing. Much of its original habitat has been cleared for cultivation and pasture and the conversion continues. "Rather uncommon; apparently shy in nature, and not often seen."
