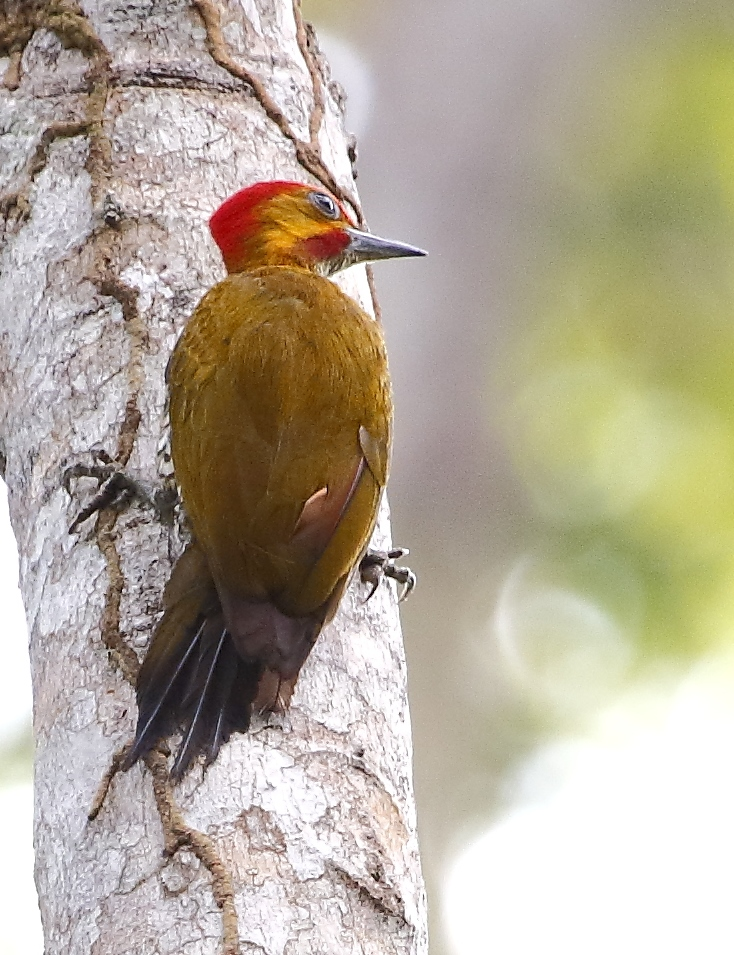
- A white-throated woodpecker (male) at Carajás National Forest, Pará, Brazil

Conservation status
- Least Concern (IUCN 3.1)

Scientific classification
- Kingdom: Animalia
- Phylum: Chordata
- Class: Aves
- Order: Piciformes
- Family: Picidae
- Genus: Piculus
- Species: P. leucolaemus

Binomial name
- Piculus leucolaemus (Natterer & Malherbe, 1845)

= White-throated woodpecker =

Species of bird

The white-throated woodpecker (Piculus leucolaemus) is a species of bird in subfamily Picinae of the woodpecker family Picidae. It is found Bolivia, Brazil, Colombia, Ecuador, and Peru.

== Taxonomy and systematics ==
The white-throated woodpecker was originally described as Picus leucolaemus. Since its inclusion in Piculus it has at times been considered conspecific with the rufous-winged woodpecker (P. simplex), the stripe-cheeked woodpecker (P. callopterus), and the Lita woodpecker (P. litae); the four may form a superspecies. It and just the Lita woodpecker have also been treated as conspecific. The white-throated woodpecker is monotypic.

== Description ==
The white-throated woodpecker is about 19 to 20 cm (7.5 to 7.9 in) long and weighs about 69 g (2.4 oz). Males and females have the same plumage except on their heads. Males are red from forehead to hindneck and very widely on the malar (cheek); the latter has a wide yellow stripe above it.The female has red only on the nape but is otherwise the same as the male. Adults of both sexes have the eponymous white chin and throat. Their upperparts are bronze-green. Their flight feathers are mostly dark brown with pale cinnamon-rufous on the inner webs. Their tail is blackish with greenish edges on the feathers. Their upper breast is yellowish green; the feathers have pale centers and dark tips. The rest of their underparts are white with olive barring. Their shortish beak is blackish to gray, their iris dark brown to red-brown, and the legs dark olive to blackish. Juveniles are greener than adults and males have red only from the rear crown to the hindneck.

== Distribution and habitat ==
The white-throated woodpecker is found from far southwestern Colombia south on the east side of the Ecuadorian and Peruvian Andes to central Bolivia. Disjunct populations are also in west and central Amazonian Brazil. It inhabits mature humid terra firme forest and várzea forest. It is a bird of the lowlands and foothills, reaching elevations of 1,000 m (3,300 ft) in Ecuador and 1,400 m (4,600 ft) in Peru.

== Behavior ==
=== Movement ===
As far as is known, the white-throated woodpecker is a year-round resident throughout its range.

=== Feeding ===
The white-throated woodpecker usually forages alone, sometimes in pairs, and also joins mixed species feeding flocks. It forages at the mid- to upper levels of the forest and typically feeds by probing and flaking off bark. Its diet is not known but is assumed to include adult and larval insects.

=== Breeding ===
Nothing is known about the white-throated woodpecker's breeding biology.

=== Vocalization ===
The white-throated woodpecker's vocalization is a "hoarse/hissing 'sraa-sraa-sraa-" or drawn-out, hissing, lowered 'wheeeeee'."

== Status ==
The IUCN has assessed the white-throated woodpecker as being of Least Concern. It has a large range, but its population size is not known and is believed to be decreasing. No immediate threats have been identified. It is poorly known and considered uncommon; "[u]ncertainty over its taxonomic position has made assessment of any past records very difficult."
