= Castle Clinton =

Restored fort in Manhattan, New York

- Castle Clinton National Monument; Castle Garden
- U.S. National Register of Historic Places
- U.S. National Monument
- New York State Register of Historic Places
- New York City Landmark
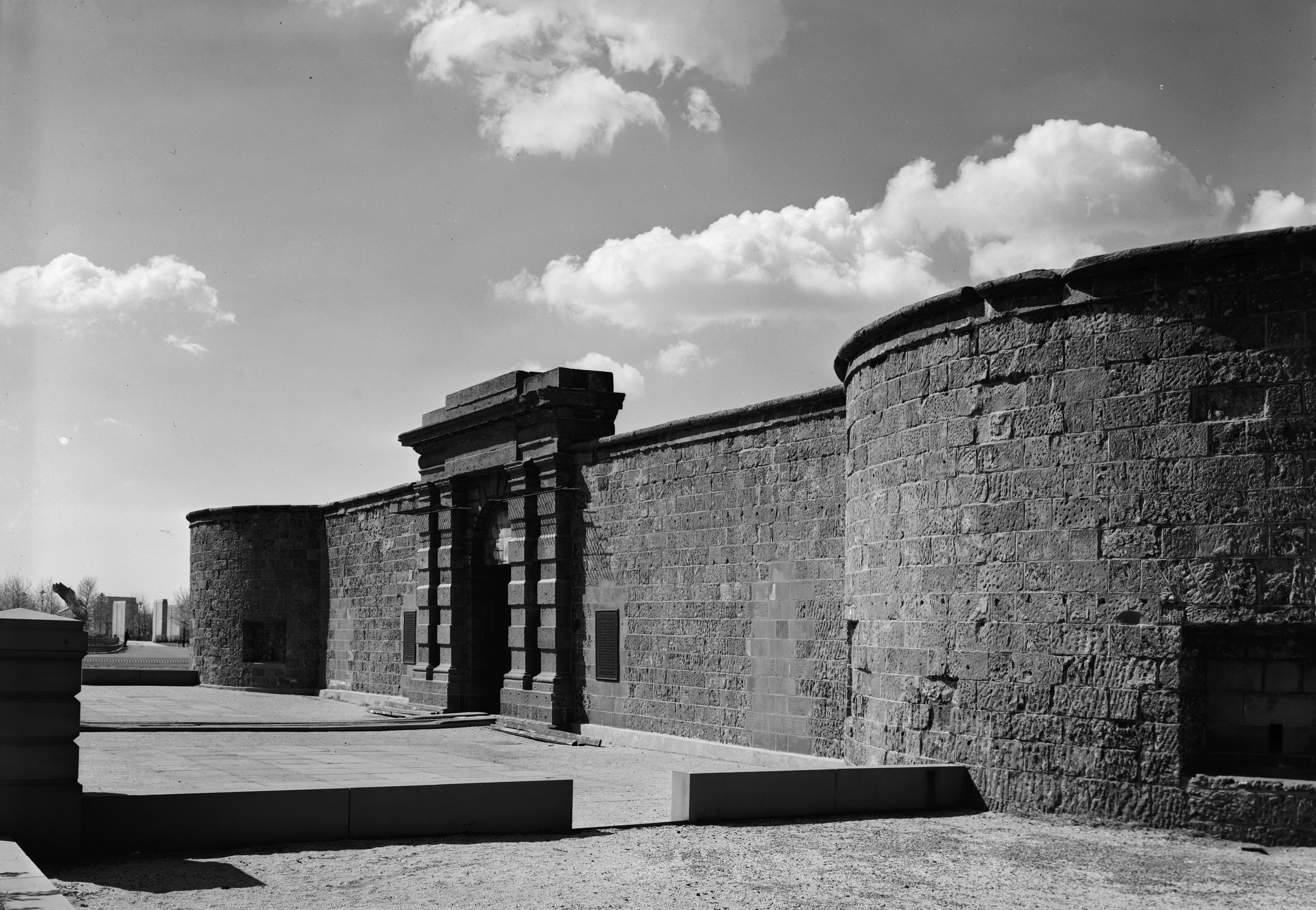
- Photo from Historic American Buildings Survey
- Location: Battery Park, Manhattan, New York
- Coordinates: 40.7035°N 74.0168°W
- Area: 1 acre (0.40 ha)
- Built: 1808
- Architect: John McComb Jr.; Jonathan Williams; U.S. War Department
- Visitation: 3,471,661 (2022)
- Website: Castle Clinton National Monument
- NRHP reference No.: 66000537
- NYSRHP No.: 06101.000431
- NYCL No.: 0029

Significant dates
- Added to NRHP: October 15, 1966
- Designated NMON: August 12, 1946
- Designated NYSRHP: June 23, 1980
- Designated NYCL: November 23, 1965

Castle Clinton (also known as Fort Clinton and Castle Garden) is a restored circular sandstone fort within Battery Park at the southern end of Manhattan in New York City, United States. Built from 1808 to 1811, it was the first American immigration station, predating Ellis Island. More than 7.5 million people arrived in the United States at Fort Clinton between 1855 and 1890. Over its active life, it has also functioned as a beer garden, exhibition hall, theater, and public aquarium. The structure is a New York City designated landmark and a U.S. national monument, and it is listed on the National Register of Historic Places.

Fort Clinton was originally known as the West Battery or the Southwest Battery, occupying an artificial island off the shore of Lower Manhattan. Designed by John McComb Jr., with Jonathan Williams as consulting engineer, the fort was garrisoned in 1812 but was never used for warfare. In 1824, the New York City government converted Fort Clinton into a 6,000-seat entertainment venue known as Castle Garden, which operated until 1855. Castle Garden then served as an immigrant processing depot for 35 years. When the processing facilities were moved to Ellis Island in 1892, Castle Garden was converted into the first home of the New York Aquarium, which opened in 1896 and continued operating until 1941. The fort was expanded and renovated several times during this period.

In the 1940s, New York City parks commissioner Robert Moses proposed demolishing Fort Clinton as part of the construction of the nearby Brooklyn–Battery Tunnel. This led to a prolonged debate over the fort's preservation, as well as the creation of the Castle Clinton National Monument in 1946. The National Park Service took over the fort in 1950. After several unsuccessful attempts to restore the fort, Castle Clinton reopened in 1975 following an extensive renovation. Since 1986, it has served as a visitor center and a departure point for ferries to the Statue of Liberty National Monument.

== Original use ==
Castle Clinton stands slightly west of where Fort Amsterdam was built in 1626, when New York City was known by the Dutch name New Amsterdam. Fort Amsterdam was demolished by 1790 after the American Revolutionary War. Proposals for a new fort were made after two separate war scares involving Britain and France in the 1790s, but neither plan was ultimately carried out. By 1805, there were growing tensions between Britain and the U.S., marking the run-up to the War of 1812. Late that year, Lieutenant Colonel Jonathan Williams of the United States Army Engineers began planning a series of fortifications in New York Harbor. Williams was part of a group of three commissioners who, in 1807, submitted a report that recommended the construction of such fortifications.

Fort Clinton, originally known as West Battery and sometimes as Southwest Battery, was built on an artificial island, created just off shore when the fort was built. Construction began in 1808, and the fort was completed in 1811, although modifications continued through the 1820s. Designed by John McComb Jr. with Jonathan Williams as consulting engineer, West Battery was roughly circular with a radius of approximately 92 feet (28 m). About one-eighth of the circle had a straight wall instead of a curved wall. The walls were made of red sandstone quarried in New Jersey. The fort had 28 thirty-two-pounder cannons. A wooden bridge led from the fort to the rest of Manhattan. West Battery was intended to complement the three-tiered Castle Williams, the East Battery, on Governors Island.

The fort was completed in late 1811, and it was garrisoned in 1812. However, the fort was never used for warfare, and British and American forces signed a peace treaty in February 1815. By then, West Battery was renamed Fort Clinton in honor of DeWitt Clinton, the mayor of New York City and later the Governor of New York. The castle proper was converted to administrative headquarters for the Army. Simultaneously, at the end of the war, there was a public movement to build a park in the Battery area. A 1816 proposal to construct two small office buildings at Fort Clinton was canceled due to public opposition, and the castle lay dormant for three years. The Common Council of New York proposed in May 1820 that the United States government transfer ownership of the castle to the city government, but the United States Congress declined to pass legislation to that effect.

By 1820, Fort Clinton was being used as a paymaster's quarters and storage area. The United States Army stopped using the fort in 1821, and it was ceded to the city by an act of Congress in March 1822. By then, the bridge leading to Fort Clinton was frequently used by fishermen who were catching fish from the bridge, which was connected to the shore at the foot of Broadway.

== Entertainment venue ==
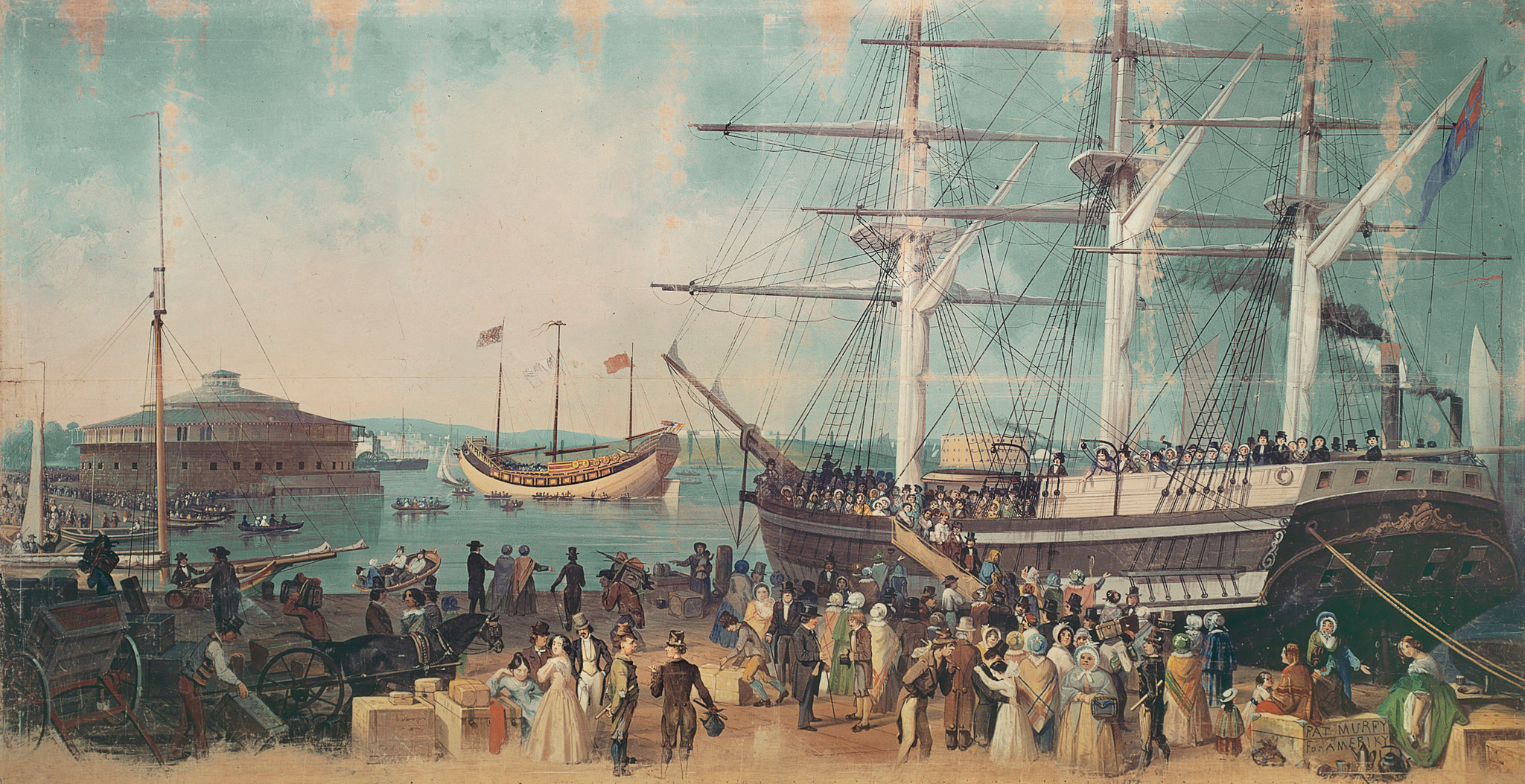
The Bay and Harbor of New York by Samuel Waugh (1814–1885), depicting the castle in 1848

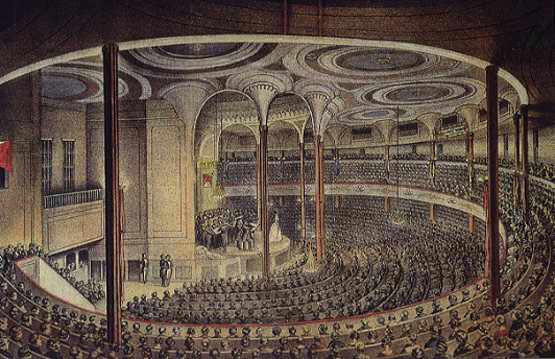
First appearance of Jenny Lind in the U.S. at Castle Garden, September 11, 1850 (lithograph by Currier and Ives)

The fort was leased to the New York City government as an entertainment venue in June 1824; the city originally paid $1,400 a year for five years. The city government subleased the fort to Francis Fitch, Arthur Roorbach, and J. Rathbone. Fort Clinton became Castle Garden, which served as a beer garden, exhibition hall, and theater. The venue contained 50 boxes, each with a table and eight seats. Atop Castle Garden was a circular promenade with a canopy above it. Castle Garden was surrounded by a gravel promenade and shrubbery atop a seawall. The New-York Daily Tribune wrote that the fort "afterward became associated with scenes of peace and popular amusement". One critic described Castle Garden in 1828 as "a favored place of public resort".

The fort reopened as Castle Garden on July 3, 1824. One of the fort's first events was in September 1824, when 6,000 people attended an event honoring General Lafayette. Over the years, the fort hosted other political figures such as U.S. presidents Andrew Jackson, John Tyler, and James K. Polk, as well as Hungarian governor-president Lajos Kossuth. Inventor Samuel Morse hosted a demonstration of a telegraph machine at Castle Garden in 1835. Around 1845, Castle Garden was converted into a theater when a roof was built above the fort's interior. The structure contained 6,000 seats. Officials were planning to expand the nearby Battery Park by 1848, adding landfill around Castle Garden to bring the park to 24 acres (9.7 ha).

The New York Philharmonic performed Beethoven's Symphony No. 9 at Castle Garden in May 1846, the piece's U.S. debut, in a concert aimed at fundraising for a new concert hall. In 1850, Swedish soprano Jenny Lind gave her first performances in the United States with two concerts at Castle Gardens; tickets for these concerts cost up to $225 (equivalent to $8,708 in 2025). A year later, Castle Garden started selling concert tickets at "popular prices" of up to 50 cents (equivalent to $19 in 2025). In the early 1850s, European dancing star Lola Montez performed her "tarantula dance", and Louis-Antoine Jullien gave dozens of successful concerts mixing classical and light music. The Max Maretzek Italian Opera Company staged the New York premieres of two operas at Castle Garden: Gaetano Donizetti's Marino Faliero on June 17, 1851, and Giuseppe Verdi's Luisa Miller on July 20, 1854.

The fort was leased to Theodore J. Allen for five years on May 1, 1854. Under the terms of the lease, Allen could expand the island around Castle Garden, but he could not infill the channel between Castle Garden and Battery Park.

== Immigrant landing and registration depot ==
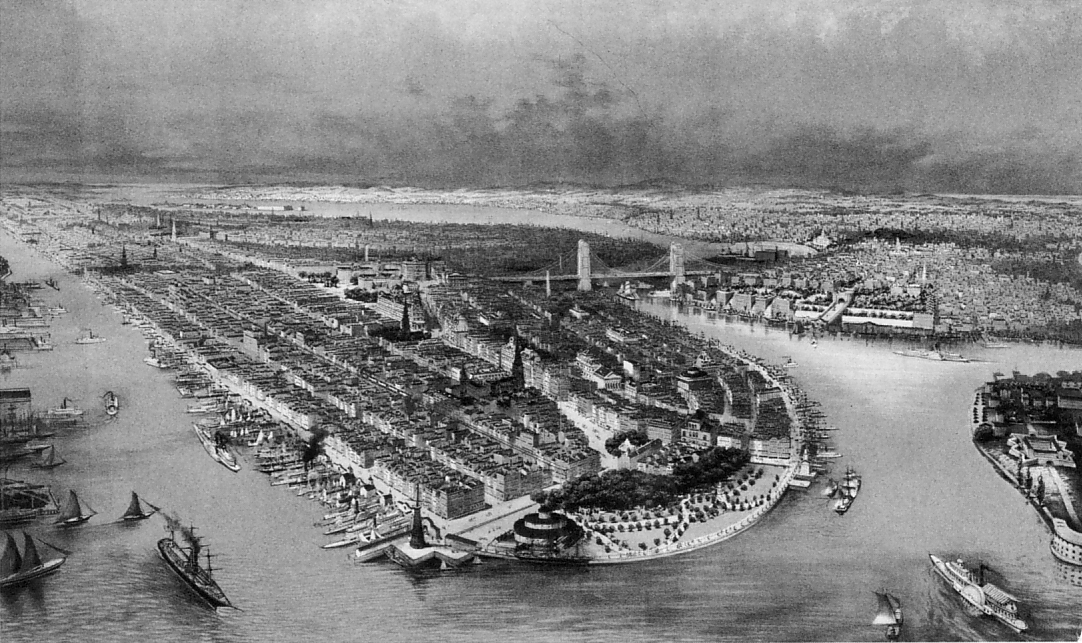
Aerial view illustration of Manhattan, showing Castle Garden at its tip, c. 1880

Castle Garden served as the first immigration depot in the U.S. from 1855 to 1890. Most of the fort, except for the section along the shoreline, was surrounded by a 1,000-foot-long (300 m) wooden fence. The fence, measuring 12 or 13 feet (3.7 or 4.0 m) high, was intended to keep out unauthorized immigrants. At the center of the fort was the waiting area, known as the rotunda. The immigrant registration depot included a quadrangle of desks arranged around this waiting area, as well as restrooms flanking the main entrance. The waiting area also had wooden benches. Although there are no precise figures for the capacity of the waiting area, various sources give a capacity of between 2,000 and 4,000. An enclosed balcony was installed around the waiting area circa 1869. The residential outbuildings around the fort became offices.

Before being processed at Castle Garden, immigrants underwent medical inspections at the Marine Hospital on Staten Island, where ill immigrants were quarantined. Those who passed their medical inspection boarded a steamship, which traveled to a dock along the northern side of Castle Garden; the dock faced away from Battery Park, preventing immigrants from entering Manhattan before they had been processed. Immigrants were inspected a second time before entering the fort. Inside the depot, a New York state emigration clerk registered each immigrant and directed them to another desk, where a second clerk advised each immigrant about their destination. Each of the immigrants then received a bottle of bathwater and returned to the dock, where their baggage was collected. The New York Central Railroad and the New York and Erie Railroad sold train tickets at Castle Garden as well.

Many of Castle Garden's original immigrant passenger records were stored at Ellis Island, where they were destroyed in a fire in 1897. Sources cite 7.5 million or 8 million immigrants as having been processed at Castle Garden. These account for the vast majority of the nearly 10 million immigrants who passed through the Port of New York between 1847 and 1890. (Note: The New York state government's Board of Commissioners of Emigration processed 9,639,635 total immigrants passed through the Port of New York between 1847 (when the board was established) and 1890. Castle Garden processed 8,280,917 immigrants between 1855 and 1889; during that period, the United States had 10,956,910 total immigrants. The Commissioners of Emigration processed an additional two million immigrants between 1847 and 1855, but they did not pass through Castle Garden.) The majority of immigrants processed at Castle Garden were from European countries, namely Denmark, England, Germany, Ireland, Italy, Russia, Scotland, and Sweden. The facility's name was pronounced Kesselgarten by German immigrants and by Yiddish-speaking Eastern European Jews. The word kesselgarten became a generic term for any situation that was noisy, confusing or chaotic, or where a "babel" of languages was spoken (a reference to the multitude of languages heard spoken by the immigrants from many countries at the site). In 2005, The New York Times estimated that one-sixth of all Americans were descended from an immigrant who had passed through Castle Garden.

=== Conversion and operation ===
==== 1850s and 1860s ====
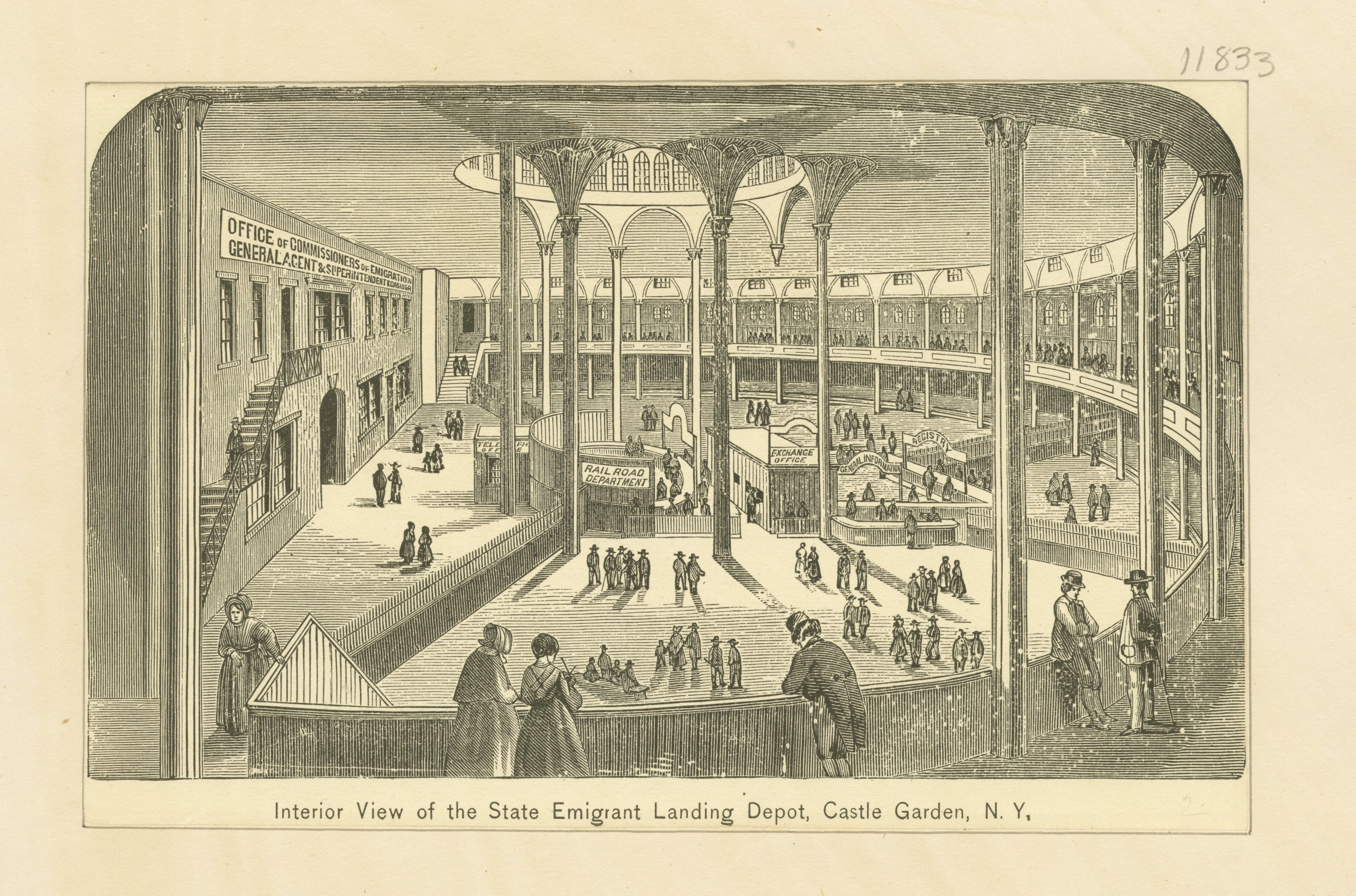
Interior view of the State Emigrant Landing Depot

The New York state government's Board of Emigration Commissioners had been established in 1847 to operate medical facilities and a registration center for immigrants. Although the board had acquired the Marine Hospital on Staten Island soon after its establishment, their efforts to open a registration center were unsuccessful for several years. Prior to the establishment of the registration center, unethical ticket-booking agents for transport lines frequently approached newly arrived immigrants, only to abscond with the immigrants' savings. The board took over Allen's lease of Castle Garden in May 1855 and made some modifications, leasing the fort for $8,000 annually (equivalent to $276,429 in 2025). Several local residents attempted to prevent the fort from being converted into an immigrant registration depot, claiming that the state government's lease was illegal and that the newly arrived immigrants would spread disease. A judge for the state's Superior Court ruled in June 1855 that work on the immigrant-processing depot could proceed.

The Emigrant Landing Depot opened within the fort on August 1, 1855, and the depot began processing immigrants two days later. The identity of the first migrant processed at the fort is unknown. Of the first five ships to arrive at Castle Garden, English laborer Richard Richards was the first person on the manifest of the largest ship. Although the New York state government endorsed Castle Garden's conversion to an immigrant-processing depot, the New York City government opposed the move and accused the Emigration Commissioners of violating the terms of their lease. Many complaints about Castle Garden came from "runners" representing booking agents and boarding house operators, who could not intercept unwitting immigrants because of Castle Garden's strict policies. The New York state government's initial four-year lease of Castle Garden expired in 1859, and state officials renewed their lease annually for the next ten years. By then, state and city officials could not agree on who owned the depot. The city, state, and federal governments continued to fight over the depot's ownership through the 1870s.

Although Castle Garden staff often mistreated immigrants, historian George J. Svejda wrote that the depot "was still the best place for immigrants upon their landing on America's shores". In 1864, to convince immigrants to enlist in the United States Armed Forces during the American Civil War, the County Bounty Committee erected a recruitment center next to Castle Garden. Two years later, the Board of Emigration Commissioners constructed a one-story labor exchange building, a waiting room, and an information office, and they made repairs to Castle Garden. The fort's exterior remained largely unchanged over the years, but the interior and many of the fort's wooden outbuildings were frequently renovated. Battery Park was expanded circa 1869 using landfill, at which point the island containing Castle Garden was incorporated into the rest of Manhattan Island. The rotunda was extensively restored at this time, and a wooden balcony was installed. By then, The New York Times wrote that the surrounding Battery Park was "a haven for the 'runners' who approached innocent Irish and German newcomers, offering them nonexistent lodgings for their money".

==== 1870s and 1880s ====
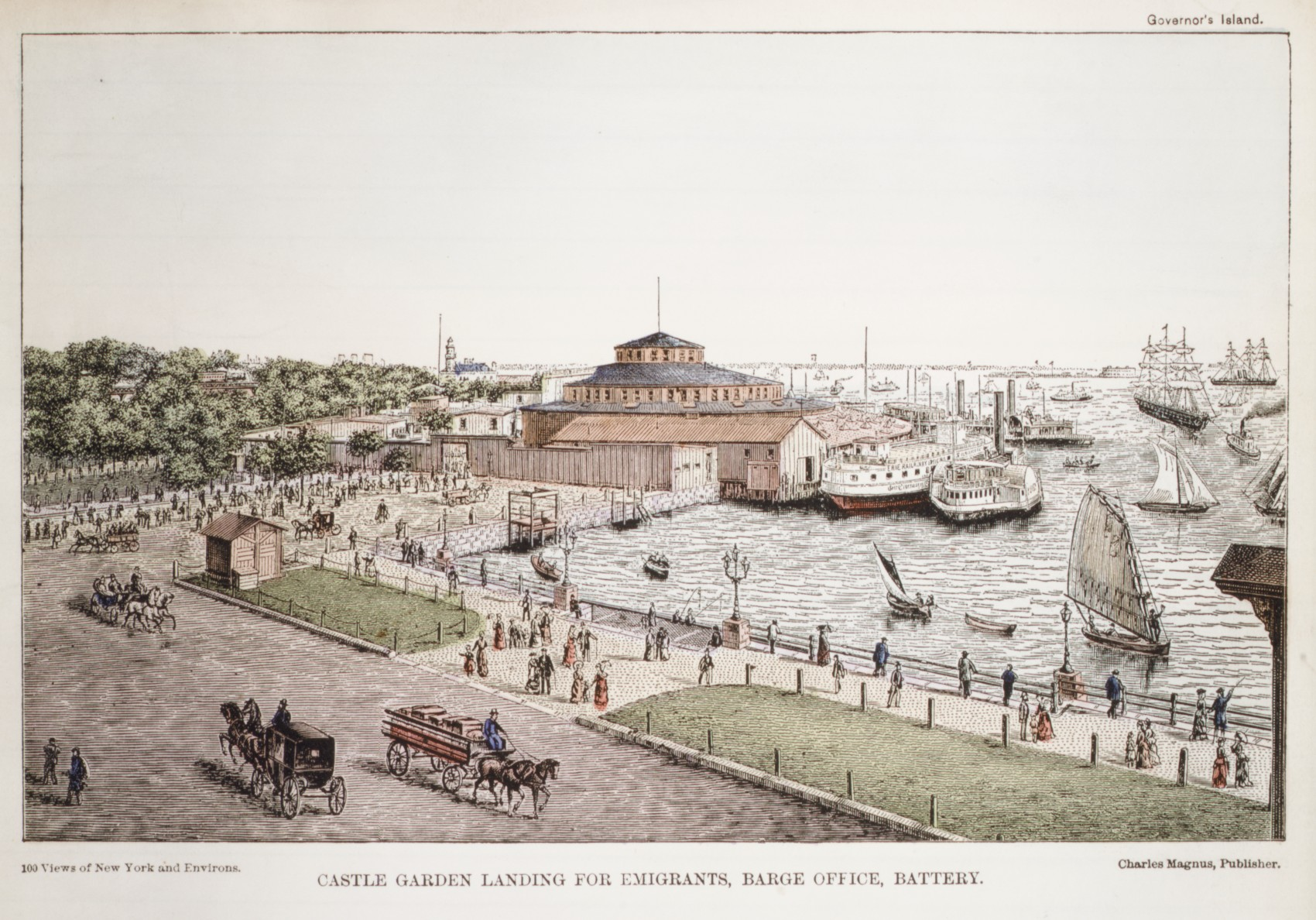
Castle Garden ferry landing and barge office

By the early 1870s, Castle Garden's information bureau employed staff members who could speak over a dozen languages. The New York state government encouraged immigrants to use other ports of entry to reduce overcrowding, so it issued a head tax on every immigrant who passed through Castle Garden. This measure was largely ineffective, as The New York Times wrote in 1874: "Castle Garden is so well known in Europe that few emigrants can be induced to sail to any other destination." By then, the immigration depot was in poor condition, with rotting floors and "tottering" offices and benches. The Board of Emigration Commissioners lost a significant source of income in 1875, when the Supreme Court of the United States invalidated a New York state law that required steamship companies to pay a head tax or put up a bond for each immigrant. Afterward, the commissioners sought funding from the state legislature. Due to budgetary shortfalls, the Emigration Commissioners disbanded the labor bureau in 1875, although the German and Irish Emigrant Societies took over the labor bureau's operation. Congress passed the Page Act of 1875, the first restrictive federal immigration law in the United States, during this time.

The structure was severely damaged in a fire on July 30, 1876. Castle Garden's exterior remained intact, as did the outbuildings to the north of the fort, but the interior was completely destroyed. In the aftermath of the fire, several city officials proposed shuttering the Castle Garden immigration center and restoring the fort as a venue for "public enjoyment". Nonetheless, the New York state government awarded a contract for Castle Garden's reconstruction in September 1876, and it reopened on November 27, 1876. As part of the $30,000 project (equivalent to $907,031 in 2025), officials installed windows in the embrasures along the facade, and they added two doorways. After the nearby Barge Office was completed in 1879, immigrants disembarked at the Barge Office, where officers examined immigrants' baggage. The baggage-collection duties soon returned to Castle Garden, and the Barge Office became a storage area.

New York state officials unsuccessfully attempted to reinstate a head tax at Castle Garden in 1881. The following year, Congress passed the Immigration Act of 1882, which imposed a head tax on non-U.S. citizens who passed through American ports, as well as restricted certain classes of people from immigrating to America. Under the 1882 act, the Emigration Commissioners earned 50 cents for each immigrant who passed through Castle Garden. Later that year, the Emigration Commissioners began collecting rent from the various companies and agents with offices at Castle Garden, and it started collecting taxes from boardinghouse operators. The Immigration Act of 1882 also prompted a jurisdictional dispute between the city, state, and federal governments. For example, in 1885, the state government refused to allocate $10,000 for repairs to the depot's ferry dock because the city technically owned Castle Garden. The state government finally provided money for repairs in 1887.

=== Closure ===
By the late 1880s, Castle Garden had become overcrowded and unhygienic, and there were numerous reports that Castle Garden officials were mistreating immigrants. Robert Chesebrough, a businessman who owned several structures around Battery Park, had also advocated for the closure of the Castle Garden processing depot. The Chicago Daily Tribune wrote that the structure was "a dilapidated rotunda surrounded by equally ramshackle structures for the housing of the strangers on these shores". The Emigration Commissioners had dismissed many of Castle Garden's employees in September 1889 because of declining income, further compounding the facility's issues. Federal and state officials also had difficulty sharing jurisdiction of Castle Garden; state officials reportedly did not enforce federal laws, as it was not part of their duties.

The federal government notified New York state officials in February 1890 that it would take over immigrant-processing duties at Castle Garden within sixty days. Federal officials planned to construct a new immigrant-processing center at another location, ultimately selecting a site on Ellis Island. Castle Garden closed on April 18, 1890, The immigrant-processing center was temporarily relocated to the Barge Office. The state's Commissioners of Emigration had forbidden the federal government to continue to use Castle Garden until the Ellis Island immigrant depot was completed. The new registration office on Ellis Island was completed in 1892. In its last year of operation, Castle Garden processed 450,394 travelers, 364,086 of whom were immigrants. When the immigrant-registration depot closed, city officials contemplated converting Castle Garden into an "amusement resort".

The New York state government formally transferred Castle Garden to the city government on December 31, 1890. By the next year, city officials had removed the wooden fence around Castle Garden, and they were planning to demolish the various outbuildings around the fort. The New York Naval Reserve's First Battalion considered relocating to Castle Garden at that time, and it subsequently used Castle Garden as a drill hall during the early 1890s.

== Aquarium ==
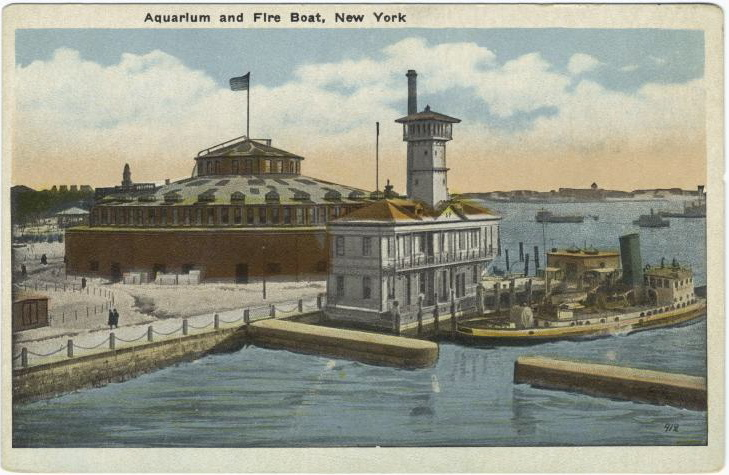
The New York Aquarium was once housed at Castle Garden (image before 1923).

Castle Garden was the site of the New York City Aquarium from 1896 to 1941. The structure was extensively altered and roofed over to a height of several stories, though the original masonry fort remained. When the fort was converted into an aquarium, the adjacent section of Battery Park was extended into the Hudson River. The interior of Castle Garden contained two circular colonnades, which supported a roof with skylights. Above the center of the fort was a green-and-yellow dome, with a verse of Scripture (Habakkuk 1:15) inscribed into the dome's base.

The aquarium could accommodate 10,000 fish and other species. At the center of the ground story was a large circular pool surrounded by six smaller elliptical pools. Fish and other marine species were loaded into the aquarium through a doorway at one end of the fort. The perimeter of the aquarium was originally surrounded by about 100 tanks of varying sizes, placed on two levels. The tanks were up to 6 feet (1.8 m) deep, with 1-inch-thick (2.5 cm) plate-glass panes and white-tiled surfaces. By 1907, there were seven large tanks at the center of the ground story, 94 large tanks and 26 smaller tanks on the walls, and 30 reserve tanks. The tanks were supplied by fresh water from the New York City water supply system and salt water from the Hudson River. Salt water passed through two bronze filters, while fresh water passed through two copper filters; the four filters could collectively process over 200,000 U.S. gallons (760,000 L) per day.

=== Conversion and opening ===
The New York City government had proposed converting Castle Garden into an aquarium in 1891. The following February, the New York State Legislature passed a bill allowing the city government to create an aquarium within Castle Garden. Julius F. Munckwitz Jr. drew up preliminary plans for an aquarium, which he presented to New York City's board of park commissioners in mid-1892. The state government voted to allocate $150,000 for the construction of an aquarium within Castle Garden. The aquarium's architect of record, H. T. Woodman, reported in April 1894 that several of the tanks were ready for use. During the renovation process, the architect alleged that the tiles in the tanks had not been installed properly, which led to a protracted dispute. The city government allocated another $25,000 for the aquarium's completion at the end of 1894 (equivalent to $930,000 in 2025).

The aquarium was supposed to have been completed by mid-1894, but it did not open for another two years. By mid-1895, the aquarium was delayed by what the New-York Tribune characterized as "gross stupidity". For instance, the skylights on the roof acted as a greenhouse that raised the temperature of the water in the tanks, and the saltwater fish in the aquarium were dying off because of the low salinity of the Hudson River. The Tribune estimated that these mistakes had increased the project's cost by $35,000 (equivalent to $1,355,000 in 2025). Local media reported in September 1896 that the aquarium was largely completed. At the time, the tanks contained 45 species, some of which had been in the aquarium for two years. Ultimately, it cost $175,000 to renovate Castle Garden into an aquarium (equivalent to $6,773,000 in 2025).

The aquarium opened on December 10, 1896, following a soft opening the previous day. The aquarium attracted thousands of visitors on its opening day, and it averaged over 10,000 visitors per day during its first several months. Visitors were not charged admission, which may have contributed to the aquarium's popularity. The aquarium had two million guests within a year, and it had 5.5 million total guests by May 1900.

=== 1900s to 1930s ===
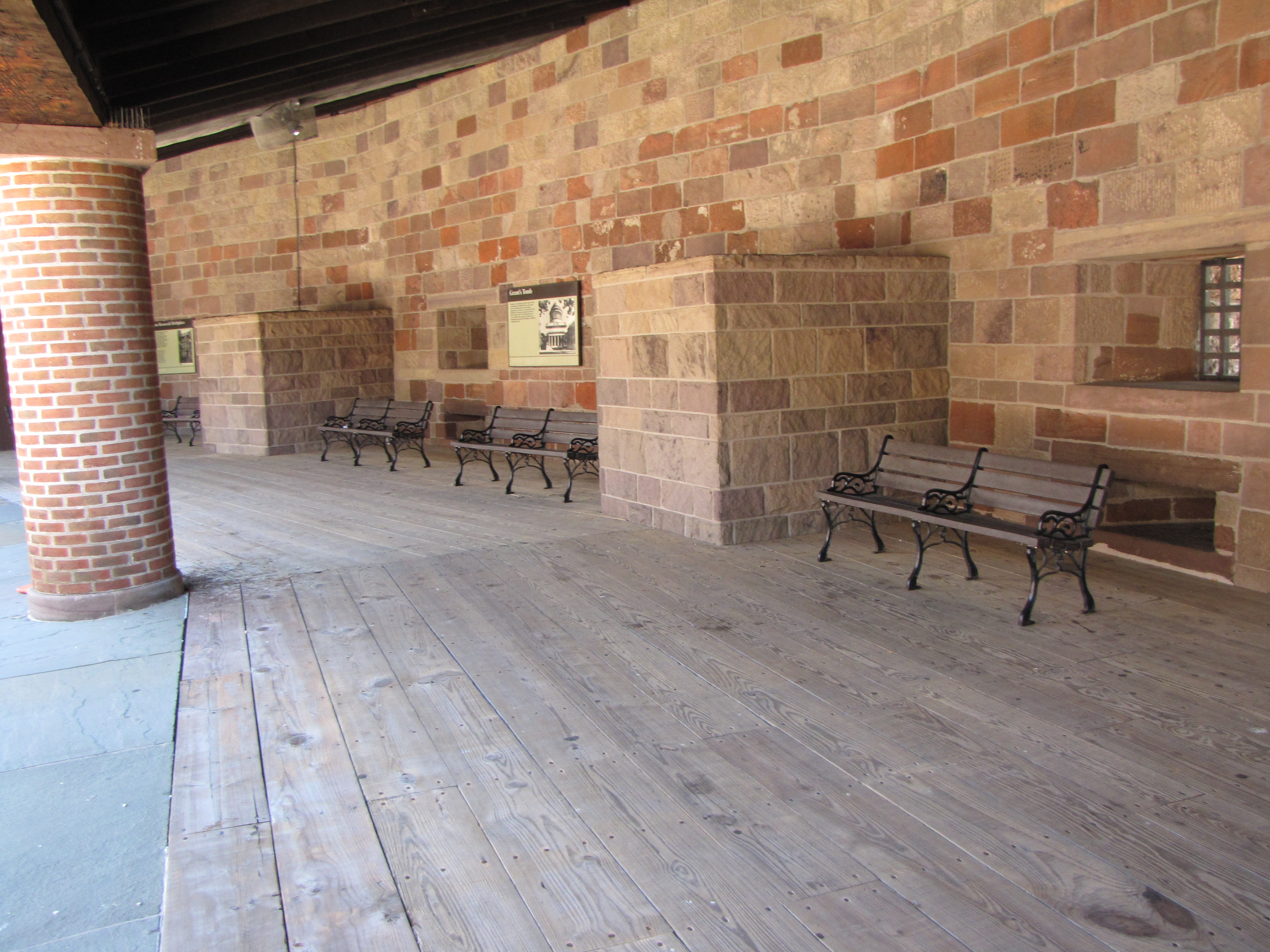
Interior of Castle Clinton

In March 1902, New York state legislators proposed transferring operation of the New York Aquarium to the New York Zoological Society. City officials had suggested the idea to remove political interference from the aquarium's operation. The New York City Board of Estimate authorized mayor Seth Low to lease the aquarium to the Zoological Society in July 1902, and the Zoological Society took over on October 31, 1902, with Charles Haskins Townsend as the aquarium's director. Townsend soon made several modifications to Castle Garden's facilities. He covered the tanks' tiled surfaces with rocks, as well as reconfiguring each of the tanks' pipes to reduce energy usage. The Zoological Society added a classroom next to the fort, and it installed a 100,000-U.S.-gallon (380,000 L) tank underneath the fort to store saltwater. The organization also repainted the interior for the first time in Castle Garden's history. These modifications cost over $30,000 (equivalent to $1,116,000 in 2025). The fort's design continued to pose issues; for example, aquarium officials discovered in 1905 that the roof skylights were causing some of the fish to become blind. The Zoological Society installed new pipes at Castle Garden in 1908.

Meanwhile, by the early 20th century, city officials were planning to rebuild Battery Park, and they considered replacing Castle Garden with a skyscraper. By January 1911, officials instead planned to expand Castle Garden, adding semicircular wings to the west and east for over $1 million. Each wing was to contain three tiers of tanks and classroom space. The Zoological Society asked the Board of Estimate to allocate $1.75 million to the renovation, but the board still had not funded the renovation of Castle Garden by 1916. Townsend said the aquarium's mechanical facilities needed major upgrades; according to Townsend, the mechanical equipment under the fort was flooded at high tide, and power was provided by coal bunkers, which had to be manually replenished every four days. In addition, the fort had never been properly renovated for the aquarium's use, and the second story's wooden frame was flammable. Townsend said the annexes would not only provide additional exhibition space but also allow the mechanical facilities to be upgraded.

In 1921, Townsend announced that the Zoological Society would spend $75,000 (equivalent to $1,354,000 in 2025) to construct an electric plant in the basement, replacing a steam plant on the south side of the fort, and then install two tanks in the space formerly occupied by the steam plant. This work was funded by a bequest from Mrs. Russell Sage. The same year, a bust of Jenny Lind was dedicated and installed at the center of the fort. The Board of Estimate voted in December 1921 to provide $105,000 for the construction of an additional story atop the fort. By early 1923, the Zoological Society was carrying out the renovations at a cost of $86,000 (equivalent to $1,625,000 in 2025). In June 1923, the board voted to give $76,500 for the construction of an additional story above the fort. The Zoological Society planned to add deeper tanks on the second floor, expanding exhibition space by 20 percent. By then, the aquarium had two million annual visitors. The expansion was largely completed by early 1924.

Townsend announced in 1926 that Castle Garden would undergo further modifications at a cost of $225,000 (equivalent to $4,092,000 in 2025). The plans included constructing a third story for workrooms and laboratory space, installing tanks behind the fort, adding a new mechanical plant in the basement, and covering the facade with a gray cement finish. Several local residents expressed opposition to these modifications and created the Battery Park Association to advocate against the plans. By the late 1920s, there were plans to reconstruct Battery Park into a formal vista. As part of this plan, an amphitheater would have been constructed in the southern end of Battery Park, complementing Castle Garden at the northern end. The Castle Garden Aquarium remained popular in the 1930s, with two million visitors per year. Two laboratories were built on the structure's third story in 1940, and a new metal dome was installed above the fort the same year. By then, the aquarium's acting director Charles M. Breder Jr. wished to develop a new building nearby, as he believed the aquarium had outgrown Castle Garden.

== Demolition attempts and preservation ==
=== Initial plans ===
In February 1941, Triborough Bridge and Tunnel Authority Commissioner Robert Moses announced that he would demolish Castle Garden when the park was rebuilt during the Brooklyn–Battery Tunnel's construction. He justified the demolition by saying that the fort had poor lighting and ventilation and that it required extensive repairs. In response, the New-York Historical Society proposed restoring the fort and turning it into a maritime museum. George McAneny, a former mayor and the chairman of the Regional Plan Association's board, proposed restoring Castle Garden; he continued to advocate the fort's preservation for nine years. Moses opposed efforts to preserve Castle Garden, saying that the old fort "never fired a shot". The city government closed the New York Aquarium and moved some fish and turtles to other aquariums in late 1941; other fish were released into the Atlantic Ocean. A new aquarium was ultimately built on Coney Island in 1957.

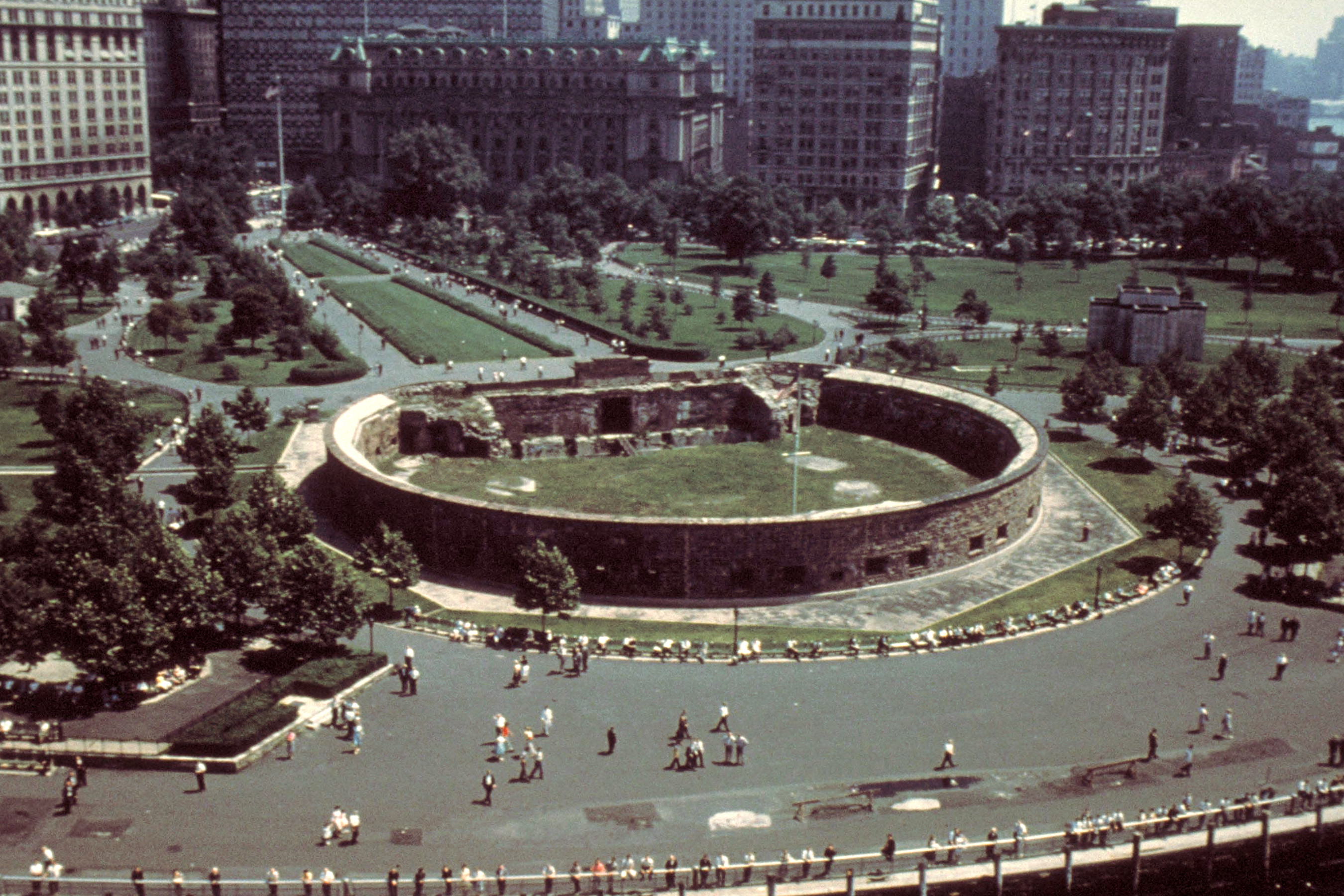
Castle Clinton was partially demolished in the 1940s.

Moses presented plans for a reconstruction of Battery Park to the Board of Estimate in March 1942, in which the fort was to be replaced by a landscaped promenade. The board voted in favor of removing the fort from Battery Park that June. City officials quickly placed the fort for sale, allowing potential buyers to preserve the fort by relocating it, but the officials rejected the sole bid from a Brooklyn junkyard operator who offered $1,120 (equivalent to $22,069 in 2025). The Fine Arts Federation of New York held an architectural design competition in August 1942, soliciting plans for a renovation of Castle Garden. Despite ongoing disputes over the fort's fate, workers began removing metal from Castle Garden on September 25, while the rest of the building remained in place for the time being. The fort's original door, attached to the wall using 768 iron bolts, was also removed.

An engineer hired by Moses to conduct a structural survey of Fort Clinton reported a "pronounced vertical crack" on the fort's walls. Preservationists asked a New York state judge to grant an injunction to prevent demolition, but a judge declined the request in April 1943. Preservationists again petitioned the Board of Estimate to preserve the building, but the board voted in October 1945 to demolish the fort.

=== Preservation as national monument ===
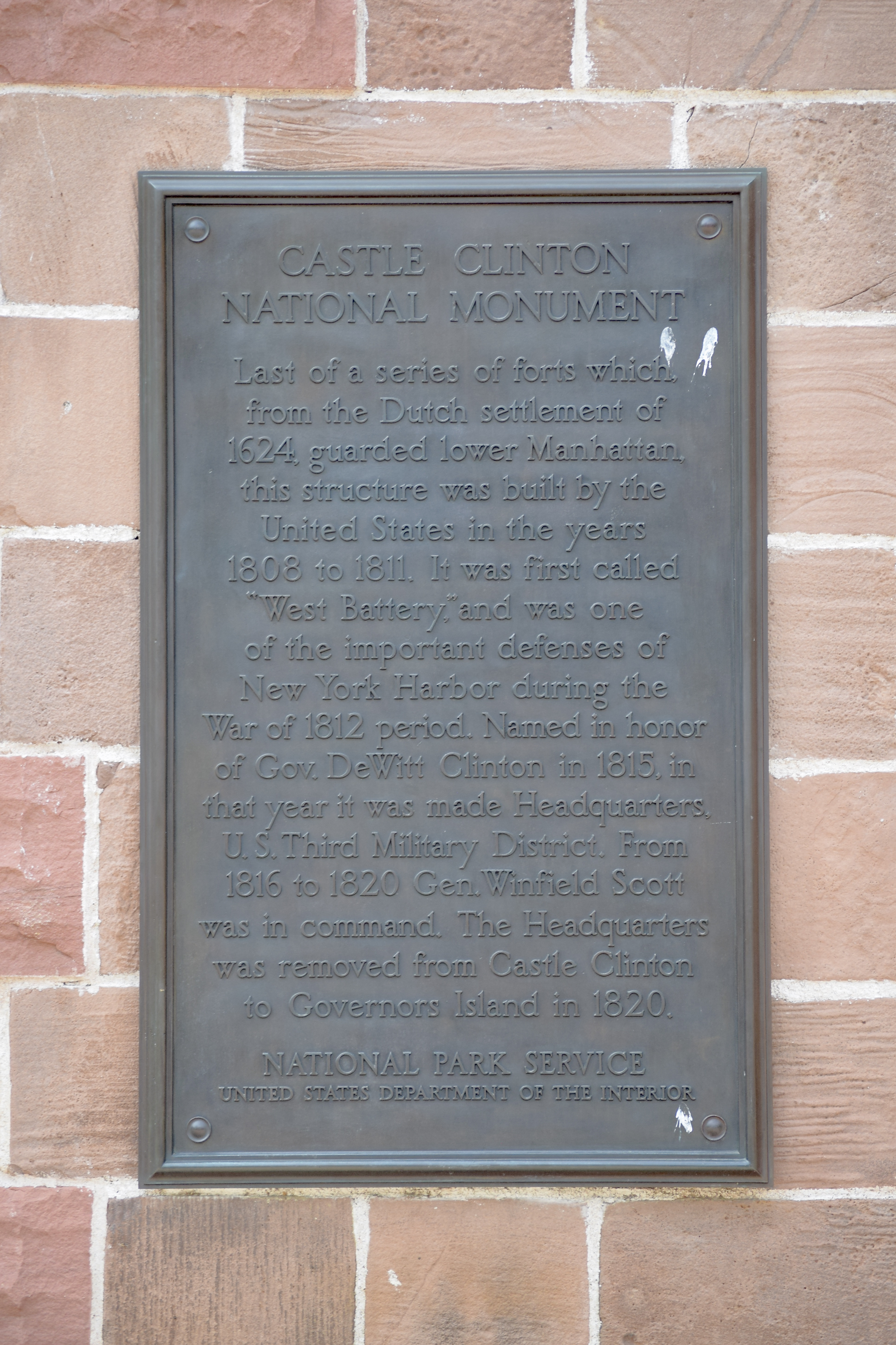
Plaque denoting Castle Clinton as a National Monument, at the entrance of the monument.

Albert S. Bard, Walter D. Binger, and other civic reformers continued to advocate in favor of preserving the fort. In July 1946, U.S. representative Sol Bloom introduced a bill to designate Castle Garden as a U.S. national monument. Both the House and the Senate approved the legislation, and president Harry S. Truman signed the bill into law on August 12, 1946, enabling the United States Department of the Interior to determine whether to take over the fort. At the time, the city government still owned the property, and the fort could not become a national monument unless the federal government took ownership. Engineers estimated that it would cost between $40,000 and $100,000 to preserve the fort while the Brooklyn–Battery Tunnel was being constructed. The city government would only retain the fort if the federal government agreed to pay for its restoration, though Moses did suggest constructing a monument on the site. After the United States Congress declined to allocate funding for Fort Clinton's renovation, the Board of Estimate voted yet again to demolish the fort in July 1947. Some demolition work did take place, but the structure was not totally demolished due to a lack of funding.

After Interior undersecretary Oscar L. Chapman indicated in August 1947 that Congress would allocate money to the project in 1948, the board voted to delay further action for one year. In the meantime, the city allocated $50,000 (equivalent to $721,000 in 2025) to shore up the fort's southeastern corner while the tunnel was being built. In March 1948, a New York State Assembly committee refused to vote on a bill that would have allowed the federal government to take over Fort Clinton. Two months later, the Board of Estimate voted to demolish the castle for the sixth time. The American Scenic and Historic Preservation Society continued to advocate for the fort's preservation, asking the New York Supreme Court to restrict the city from demolishing Fort Clinton in July 1948. The state Supreme Court issued an injunction that December, requiring the New York City Art Commission to approve any proposal to demolish the fort, but the Supreme Court's Appellate Division struck down this injunction in March 1949.

By early 1949, U.S. president Harry S. Truman had also expressed support for preserving Fort Clinton. The Assembly voted in March 1949 to cede the fort to the federal government, and the New York State Senate passed an identical bill. New York governor Thomas E. Dewey signed the bill the next month, allowing the city to transfer the fort to the federal government. Separately, the New York City Council voted to allow the New York state government to take over Fort Clinton if the federal government did not want to take over ownership. The U.S. House voted in October to allocate $165,750 for the fort's restoration (equivalent to $2,243,000 in 2025), allowing the National Park Service (NPS) to start restoring the fort after the federal government gained ownership. The city's mayor William O'Dwyer supported the fort's preservation, but, due to legal technicalities, the city government did not transfer ownership of the fort for several months. On July 18, 1950, the city deeded the land and castle to the federal government.

== Federal government ownership ==
The modern-day Castle Clinton is a one-story structure with a radius of 92 feet (28 m). The roof above the fort's interior has largely been removed, and there is a nearly circular, open-air parade ground at the center of the fort. It is surrounded by a wall measuring 8 feet (2.4 m) thick. The stucco on the facade was removed under the National Park Service's ownership, and the brownstone-and-ashlar exterior walls were restored to their original condition. Underneath the walls is a rough stone foundation. The circumference of the fort contains a portico with wooden columns surrounding a canopy. There is also a gravel courtyard, brick powder magazines, and two subterranean water tanks covered by wooden trapdoors. The SeaGlass Carousel is just southeast of the modern-day fort.

Since 1986, the fort's interior has housed an information kiosk and ticket booths for the Statue of Liberty National Monument, which comprises the Statue of Liberty and Ellis Island; the fort continues to sell tickets for the Statue of Liberty National Monument as of 2023. Statue Cruises, which operates the only ferry line to Liberty Island and Ellis Island, sells ferry tickets inside the fort. Admission to Castle Clinton itself is free, and the National Park Service gives guided tours when the monument is open to the public. The fort also contains a small history exhibit and occasionally hosts concerts. The nonprofit Battery Conservancy is also housed within Castle Clinton. According to the NPS, Castle Clinton typically has over three million visitors a year, making it one of the most visited national monuments in the United States.

=== Restoration ===
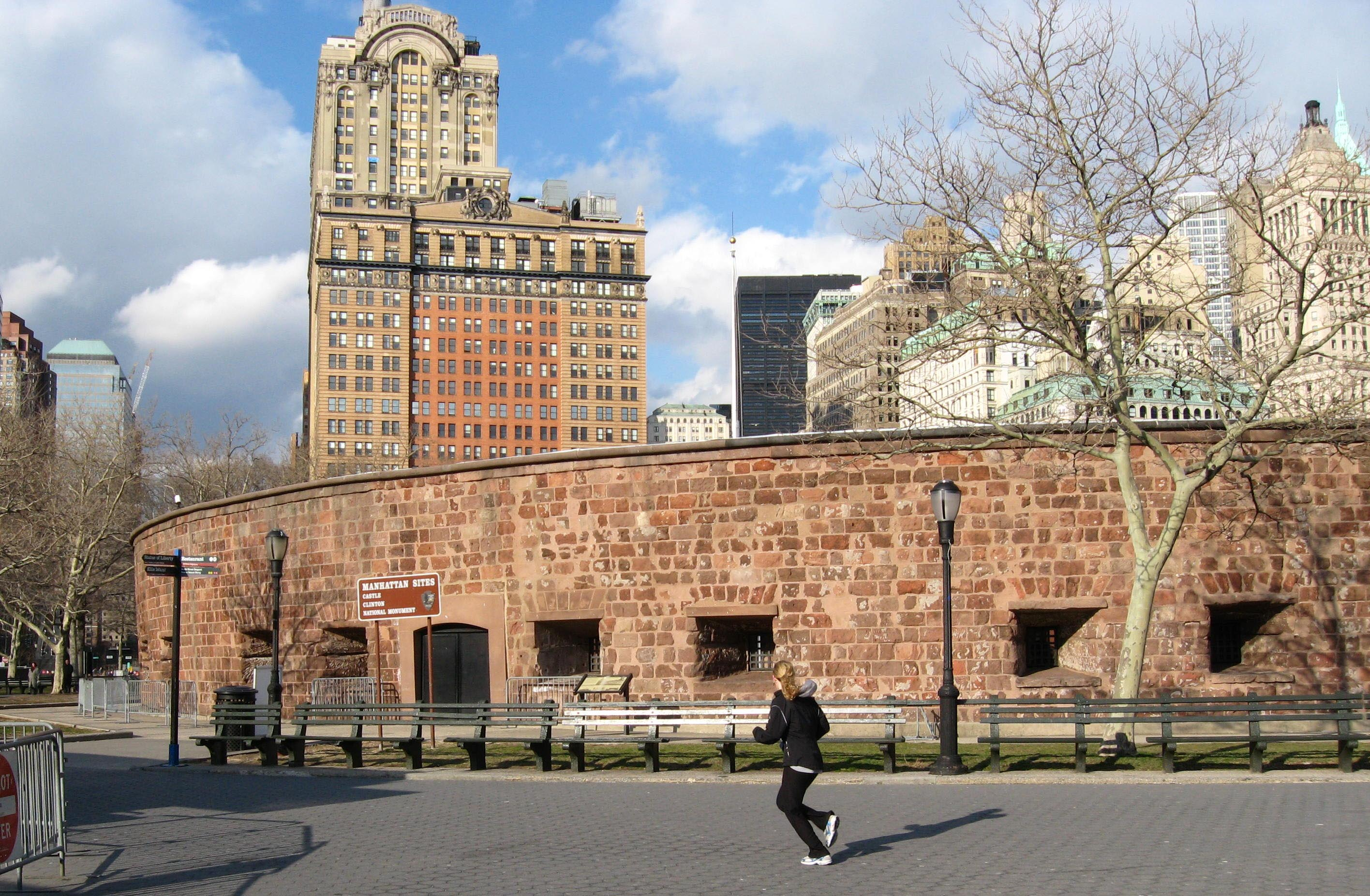
View of Castle Clinton in 2008

The Castle Clinton National Monument was formally dedicated on October 24, 1950. Battery Park reopened to the public two years later, although Castle Clinton had not yet been restored at the time. The NPS announced in early 1952 that it would begin restoring the fort's exterior; the project was expected to cost $117,000 (equivalent to $1,419,000 in 2025) and take two years. As part of this project, the NPS reconstructed the fort's original door. Following the partial demolition of Fort Clinton in the 1940s, only the exterior wall remained intact. The interior of the fort was so dilapidated that, according to The New York Times, "not even grass grew in the desolate, cratered parade ground".

In 1954, the New York City Council passed a resolution asking Congress to establish a committee to provide suggestions for restoring Castle Clinton, the Federal Hall National Memorial, and the Statue of Liberty National Monument. The next year, the federal government created the New York City National Shrines Advisory Board. The board first convened in February 1956, and the federal government allocated $498,500 that July for a renovation of Castle Clinton (equivalent to $5,903,000 in 2025). In February 1957, the board recommended allocating $3 million for the restoration of the three sites. The United States Department of the Interior subsequently postponed the repair project to 1966. This led architect Frederick G. Frost Jr. to propose in 1958 that the fort be renovated for use as a maritime museum and a restaurant. In 1962, New York City parks commissioner Newbold Morris proposed relocating 18 columns from the soon-to-be-demolished Pennsylvania Station to a promenade outside Castle Clinton. This never happened, and the columns were instead dumped in a landfill in New Jersey.

Castle Clinton was one of the earliest buildings that the New York City Landmarks Preservation Commission (LPC) considered protecting as a New York City landmark. The LPC designated the fort as a city landmark in November 1965, seven months after the city's landmarks law was signed. Subsequently, Castle Clinton was listed on the National Register of Historic Places on October 15, 1966, the day the National Historic Preservation Act of 1966 went into effect.

A restoration of Castle Clinton commenced in August 1968. The work included restoring the exterior and interior walls; adding a shingle roof; removing a moat and other facilities related to the fort's use as an aquarium; and repairing officers' quarters, parade ground, and ammunition storage areas. This renovation was supposed to last one year. The federal government postponed funding for further restoration because of the Vietnam War. The NPS commenced a wider-ranging restoration project c. 1972, which cost about $750,000 (equivalent to $5,773,000 in 2025). As part of this project, the officers' quarters were restored, and an exhibit was placed inside a former powder magazine. Preservationists were advocating for Castle Clinton to be used as a performing-arts center by late 1972. The following June, the fort hosted its first concert since the 1850s, a performance commemorating Jenny Lind. Castle Clinton reopened on May 25, 1975, with a performance of Beethoven's 9th by the American Symphony Orchestra. City and federal officials rededicated the monument the next month.

=== Use as national monument ===
==== 1970s to 1990s ====
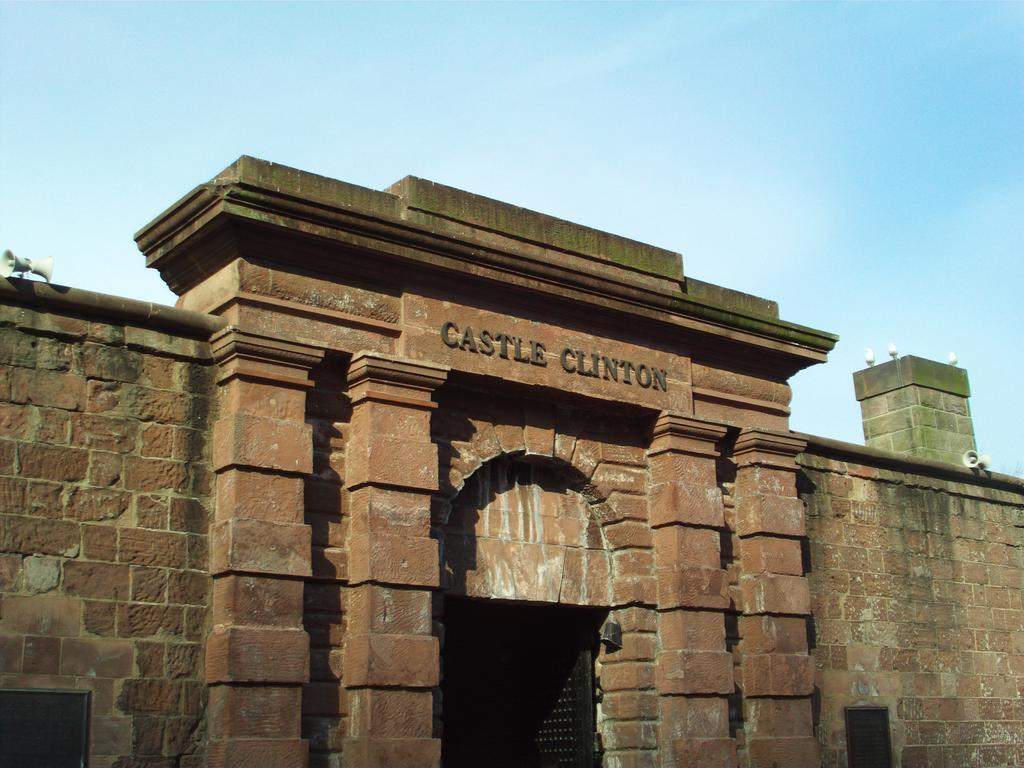
Entrance to Castle Clinton

When it reopened, Castle Clinton hosted concerts for the public during summer weekends, and it also hosted exhibits and guided tours. The fort contained dioramas depicting Manhattan at various points in the 19th and 20th centuries. In 1979, the NPS and the Manhattan Cultural Council commissioned four sculptures, which were installed within Castle Clinton's central courtyard. Following a series of thefts and break-ins at Castle Clinton in the early 1980s, the NPS stationed several armed guards outside the fort. In the decade after it was rededicated, the fort was open nine months a year, operating five days per week. NPS officials estimated that the fort had no more than 100,000 annual visitors.

The NPS closed Castle Clinton for renovations in December 1985. It announced plans to install two ticket booths and a waiting area for ferries to the Statue of Liberty National Monument. The NPS planned to spend $1.5 million to replace two structures, add exhibitions, restore the roof and parade ground, and reconstruct a doorway that had been sealed in 1974. The fort was to operate every day of the week, year-round, though the NPS subsequently decided to close all national monuments in Manhattan on Sundays. The NPS expected that the fort would attract up to five million visitors a year. A ferry pier was also installed behind Castle Clinton. The fort reopened the weekend of July 4, 1986, as a visitor center and ticket office for the Statue of Liberty National Monument. Castle Clinton also began selling ferry tickets to Ellis Island in 1990, when that island's main building was converted into a museum.

By 1996, the Conservancy for Historic Battery Park was raising $350,000 (equivalent to $718,000 in 2025) for a seasonal tensile structure, to be placed above the fort between April and October of each year. The conservancy wished to raise another $25 million to $30 million and convert Castle Clinton into an educational and cultural center. This was part of a $5.5 million renovation of the adjacent waterfront promenade within Battery Park, which was completed in November 2001, although the tensile structure was not installed. The Battery Park Conservancy had selected Thomas Phifer in 2001 to redesign Castle Clinton as a performing-arts center, but the redesign was stalled for several years.

==== 2000s to present ====
The National Guard occupied Castle Clinton for six weeks after the September 11 attacks in 2001. Castle Clinton reopened to the public on October 22, 2001, though the ferries to the Statue of Liberty National Monument were not operating at the time. That December, the NPS erected a tent with seven body scanners at Castle Clinton, where visitors to the Statue of Liberty National Monument underwent a security screening. The facility could not handle large crowds, often resulting in waits of more than one hour. The NPS considered relocating the security-screening facilities to the nearby City Pier A in 2003 but decided against it. Although the security tent in front of Castle Clinton had been intended as a temporary measure, it remained in place for more than a decade. The security screening facilities were supposed to have been relocated to Ellis Island in 2013, though in 2024, the screening facilities were still located southeast of Castle Clinton.

During excavations for the nearby South Ferry station in late 2005, builders found the remains of a stone wall dating from the late 17th or 18th centuries. Workers subsequently found another wall under the site, and the NPS exhibited part of one of the walls inside Castle Clinton. As of 2026, Castle Clinton remains a visitor center and ticket office for the Statue of Liberty National Monument.

== See also ==
- List of national monuments of the United States
- List of New York City Designated Landmarks in Manhattan below 14th Street
- National Register of Historic Places listings in Manhattan below 14th Street
