= Walter D. Binger =

US civil engineer

- Born: January 16, 1888; New York City, U.S.
- Died: March 17, 1979 (aged 91); Lenox Hill, New York City, U.S.
- Education: Massachusetts Institute of Technology (BS)
- Occupation: Civil Engineer
- Spouse: Louisa Beatrice Bronson Sorchan
- Children: Charlotte Binger Hasen; Frances Binger Mitchell; Bronson Binger
- Parent(s): Frances Newgass Binger; Gustav Binger
- Family: Elsie Naumburg (sister); Carl Binger (brother)

Walter D. Binger (January 16, 1888 – March 17, 1979) was a civil engineer and member of the historical preservationist movement in New York City.

== Early life and education ==
Walter Binger was born in New York City on January 16, 1888. His parents were Frances (née Newgass) and Gustav Binger. He had three siblings: Elsie Naumburg, Robert Binger, and Carl Binger. He attended the Massachusetts Institute of Technology and graduated in 1916 with a degree in civil engineering.

During World War I, Binger was a second lieutenant in the Air Service Construction Division of the American Expeditionary Force. He ran his own company, Thompson & Binger Inc., from 1920 until 1928.

== Career ==
=== Engineering and public works ===
In 1934, Binger joined the administration of Mayor Fiorello LaGuardia as Deputy City Commissioner of Sanitation. In the 1930s, he oversaw projects to construct sewage treatment facilities for Coney Island, Wards Island, and Tollmans Island. From 1938 to 1945, he worked as Commissioner of Borough Works for Manhattan. In this role he directed the construction of the Harlem River Drive and the East River Drive. He also directed the 1938 renovation and modernization of the Fulton Fish Market.

Binger served as chairman of the National Engineering Advisory Committee during World War II. He did consulting work on civil defense for the British government and on public works systems for Iran. He was a fellow of the American Society of Civil Engineers and served as its national director from 1952 to 1954.

=== Preservationism ===
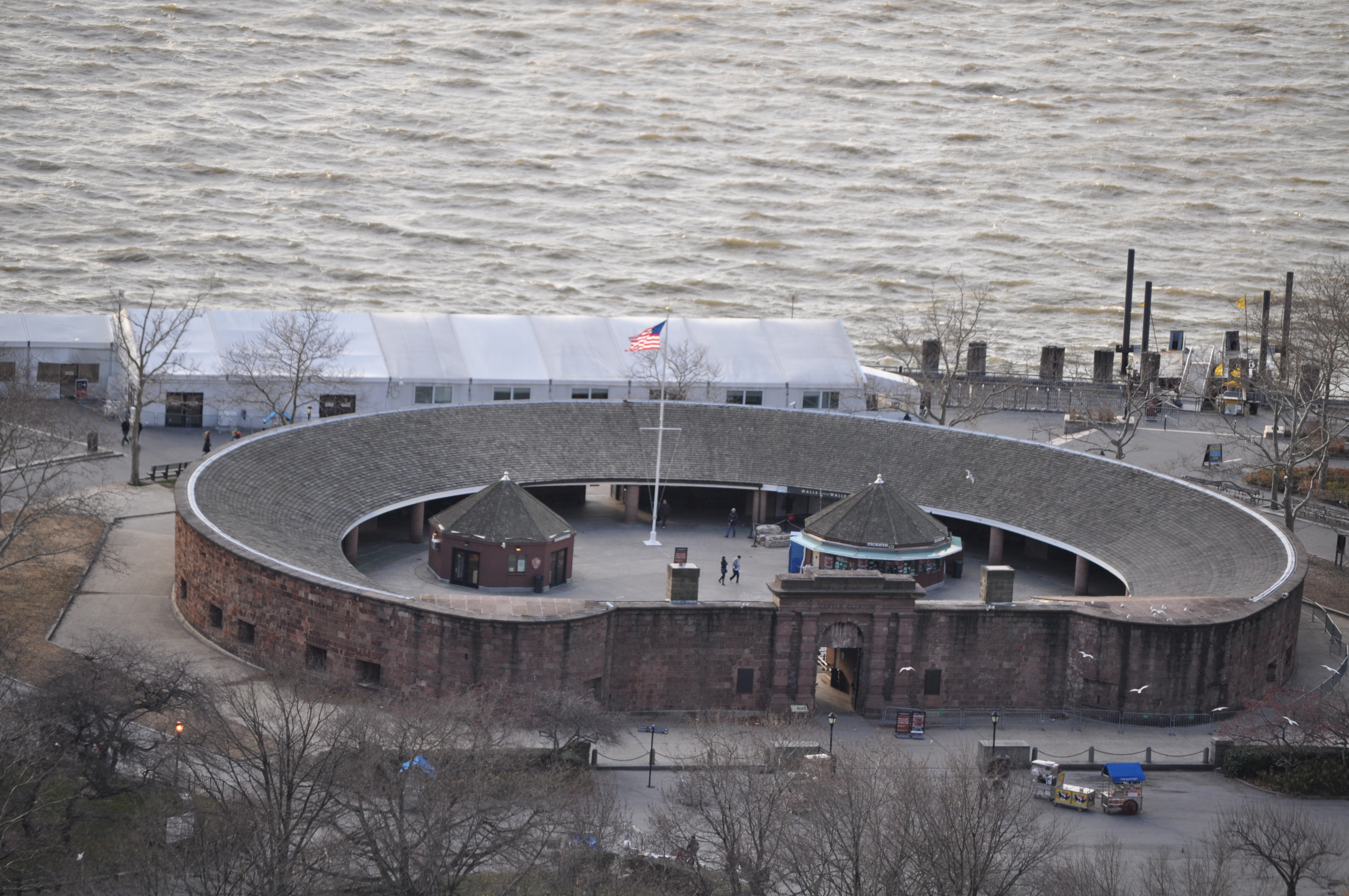
Castle Clinton

During the 1940s, Binger used his technical expertise to oppose Robert Moses's sweeping plans to transform Lower Manhattan. In 1939 he and fellow civil engineer Ole Singstad were commissioned to analyze the cost and visual impact of Moses's proposal for a Brooklyn-Battery Bridge. Their report highlighted the extent to which the bridge would have obstructed views on both sides of the East River and proved Moses's initial cost projections to be vastly underestimated. Although the bridge proposal was later approved by the New York City Council, it was never built, and the Brooklyn–Battery Tunnel now serves its intended purpose.

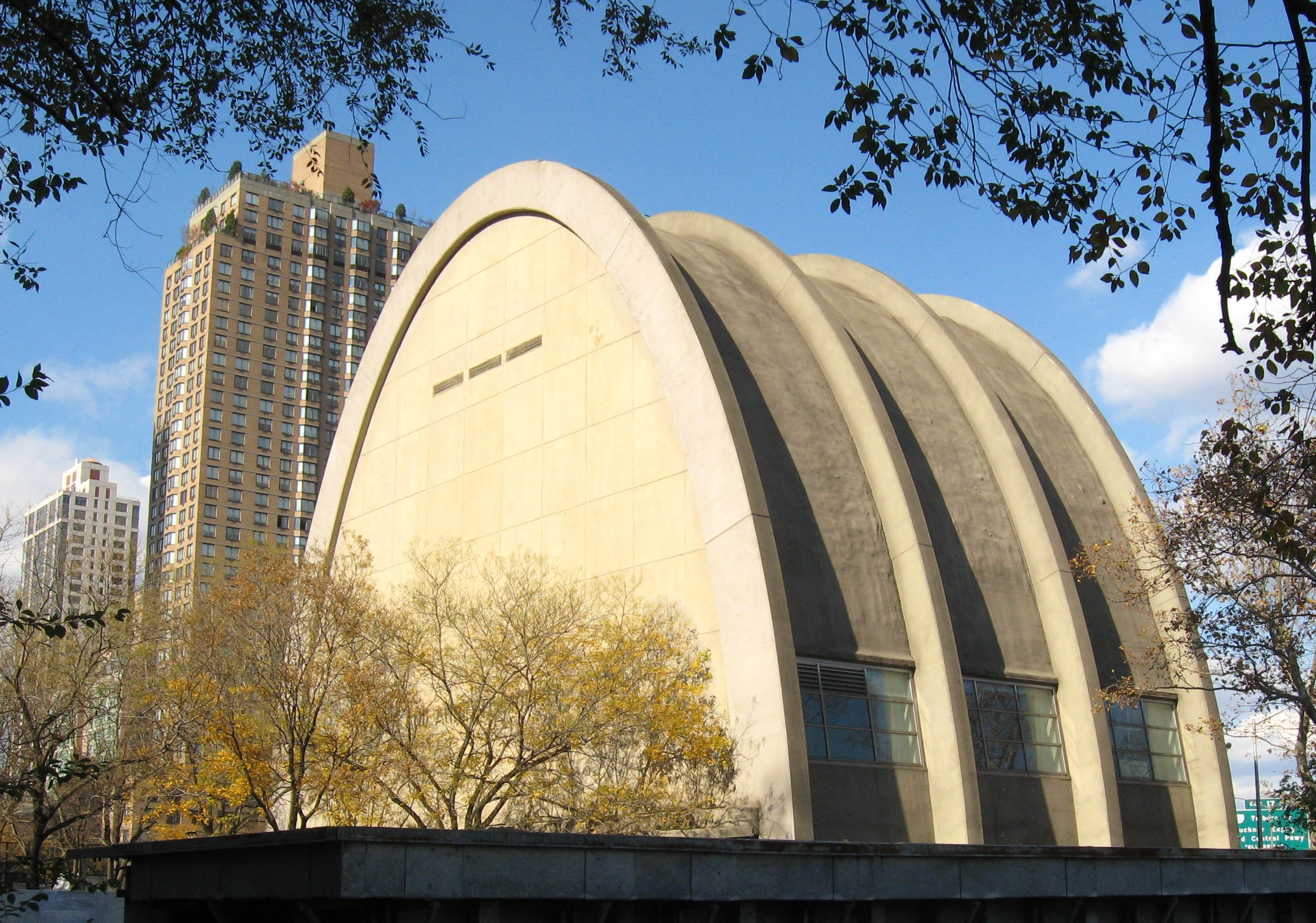
Municipal Asphalt Plant

Binger fought to save Castle Clinton, a historic fort in Battery Park, after Moses called for it to be demolished. Binger performed an inspection of the site and reported that Moses had been exaggerating when he described the fort's state of disrepair. He was part of a lawsuit brought against Moses to prevent the demolition order from being acted on, and his attorney, Frederick van Pelt Bryan, obtained an injunction against Moses just as the demolition was scheduled to begin. After a long legal battle, the community efforts to save Castle Clinton were ultimately successful, helped along by Binger's copious letters to the editor of the New York Times advocating for the preservationist cause. Castle Clinton was preserved as a National Historic Monument in 1950.

Binger also clashed with Moses over the design of the Municipal Asphalt Plant at York Avenue and 91st Street. He was responsible for the building's commission and final modernist design by Ely Jacques Kahn and Robert Allan Jacobs, which Moses called "the most hideous waterfront structure ever inflicted on a city by a combination of architectural conceit and official bad taste." Binger defended it as "almost surely the most functional large building in the world" and was backed by the Museum of Modern Art, which selected the Municipal Asphalt Plant as one of the 47 best buildings constructed in the U.S. between 1932 and 1944. The iconic arched building, which is no longer in use for city works, is on the National Register of Historic Places.

=== Writing and philanthropy ===
Binger wrote books about engineering, including What Engineers Do: An Outline of Construction (1928) and What Engineers Do: Engineering for Everyman (1938). He also wrote about a favorite pastime, fox hunting, in his book Irish Fox Hunt. After retiring from engineering, he served as the president for the Jacob and Valeria Langelogh Foundation, an organization advocating for better elder care in nursing facilities.

== Personal life ==
Binger was married to Louisa Beatrice Bronson Sorchan, with whom he had three children: Charlotte Binger Hasen, Frances Binger Mitchell, and Bronson Binger. His son Bronson Binger was an architect and historic preservationist.

Walter Binger died in Lenox Hill on March 17, 1979, at the age of 91.
