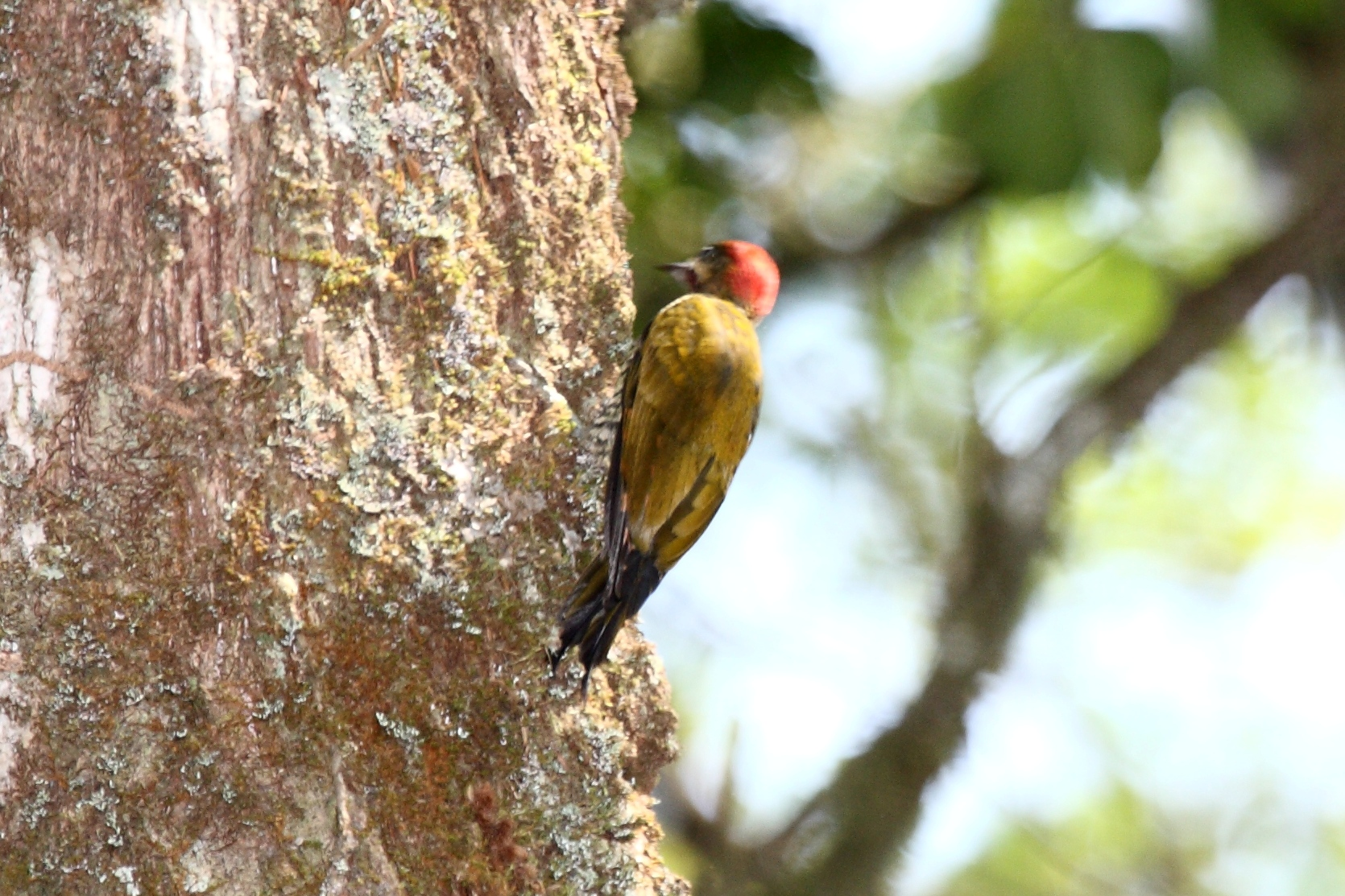

Conservation status
- Least Concern (IUCN 3.1)

Scientific classification
- Kingdom: Animalia
- Phylum: Chordata
- Class: Aves
- Order: Piciformes
- Family: Picidae
- Genus: Piculus
- Species: P. callopterus

Binomial name
- Piculus callopterus (Lawrence, 1862)

= Stripe-cheeked woodpecker =

Species of bird

The stripe-cheeked woodpecker (Piculus callopterus) is a species of bird in subfamily Picinae of the woodpecker family Picidae. It is endemic to Panama.

== Taxonomy and systematics ==
The stripe-cheeked woodpecker was originally described as Chloronerpes callopterus. Since its inclusion in Piculus it has at times been considered conspecific with the rufous-winged woodpecker (P. simplex), the white-throated woodpecker (P. leucolaemus), and the Lita woodpecker (P. litae); the four may form a superspecies. The stripe-cheeked woodpecker is monotypic.

== Description ==
The stripe-cheeked woodpecker is about 17 cm (6.7 in) long. Males and females have the same plumage except on their heads. Males are red from forehead to hindneck and very widely on the malar (cheek); the latter has a buffy white stripe above it. The rest of its face is olive. The female has red only from the back of the crown to the hindneck but is otherwise the same as the male. Adults of both sexes have bronze-green upperparts. Their flight feathers are mostly cinnamon-rufous with dark brown bars. Their tail is blackish with some cinnamon-rufous on the outer feathers. Their throat and upper breast are greenish olive; the latter has yellowish spots. The rest of their underparts are buffy white with greenish olive barring. Their shortish beak is blackish with a paler mandible, their iris sky-blue to pale gray, and the legs olive-gray. Juveniles are duller than adults; their throat and breast are mottled, and their underparts' barring is uneven. Males have red only from the rear crown to the hindneck.

== Distribution and habitat ==
The stripe-cheeked woodpecker is found from Veraguas Province in west-central Panama to Darién Province, mostly on the Caribbean side. Though there are sightings very near the Colombian border, the South American Classification Committee of the American Ornithological Society has no records from Colombia. The stripe-cheeked woodpecker inhabits the interior and edges of humid forest at elevations between 300 and 900 m (1,000 and 3,000 ft).

== Behavior ==
=== Movement ===
As far as is known, the stripe-cheeked woodpecker is a year-round resident throughout its range.

=== Feeding ===
The stripe-cheeked woodpecker usually forages alone or in pairs, and also joins mixed species feeding flocks. It forages at the lower to mid-levels of the forest. It mostly feeds by pecking into the substrate. Its diet is not known in detail but does include ants.

=== Breeding ===
The stripe-cheeked woodpecker's breeding season has not been fully defined but is known to include April and May. The few nest cavities discovered have been in dead trees between about 3.4 and 6 m (10 and 20 ft) above the ground. The clutch size, incubation period, time to fledging, and details of parental care are not known.

=== Vocalization ===
The stripe-cheeked woodpecker's primary call is "a nasal bi-syllabic note 'nyeeeh-wheet'"; both sexes utter it, singly or in a fast series. "Other vocalizations include scolding and a fast chattering series of short nasal notes, presumably when excited."

== Status ==
The IUCN has assessed the stripe-cheeked woodpecker as being of Least Concern. Though it has a restricted range and its estimated population of at least 20,000 mature individuals is believed to be decreasing, these values have not reached the thresholds for rating it Near Threatened. No immediate threats have been identified. It is poorly known and considered uncommon and local.
