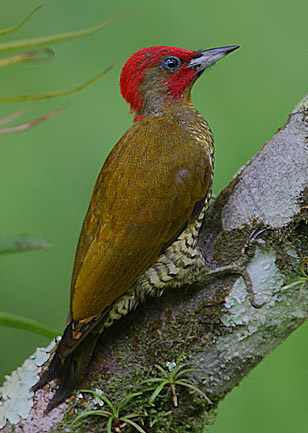
- Adult male

Conservation status
- Least Concern (IUCN 3.1)

Scientific classification
- Kingdom: Animalia
- Phylum: Chordata
- Class: Aves
- Order: Piciformes
- Family: Picidae
- Genus: Piculus
- Species: P. simplex

Binomial name
- Piculus simplex (Salvin, 1870)

= Rufous-winged woodpecker =

Species of bird

The rufous-winged woodpecker (Piculus simplex) is a species of bird in subfamily Picinae of the woodpecker family Picidae. It is found in Costa Rica, Honduras, Nicaragua and Panama.

== Taxonomy and systematics ==
The rufous-winged woodpecker was originally described as Chloronerpes simplex. Since its inclusion in Piculus it has at times been considered conspecific with the stripe-cheeked woodpecker (P. callopterus), the white-throated woodpecker (P. leucolaemus), and the Lita woodpecker (P. litae); the four may form a superspecies. The rufous-winged woodpecker is monotypic but at times part of the Honduran population has been proposed as a subspecies.

== Description ==
The rufous-winged woodpecker is about 18 cm (7.1 in) long and weighs 51 to 55 g (1.8 to 1.9 oz). Males and females have the same plumage except on their heads. Males are red from forehead to hindneck and very widely on the malar (cheek); the rest of its face is brownish green. The female's head is mostly brownish olive with red only on the nape and hindneck. Adults of both sexes have bronze-green upperparts. Their flight feathers are mostly cinnamon-rufous with much dark olive on the webs. Their tail is blackish with a hint of cinnamon-rufous on the outer feathers. Their throat and upper breast are olive-green; the upper breast has pale buffish yellow spots. The rest of their underparts are pale yellow-buff with dark olive bars. Their shortish beak is blackish with a paler gray mandible, their iris pale bluish or yellowish to white, and the legs olive to grayish. Juveniles are duller, grayer, and greener; their throat and breast have buffish green spots, and their underparts' barring is uneven. Males have red only from the rear crown to the hindneck.

== Distribution and habitat ==
The rufous-winged woodpecker is found from eastern Honduras through Nicaragua and Costa Rica into western Panama. It inhabits humid forest but sometimes ventures to isolated large trees in open areas nearby. In elevation it occurs up to 750 m (2,500 ft) on the Caribbean side and to 900 m (3,000 ft) on the Pacific side.

== Behavior ==
=== Movement ===
The rufous-winged woodpecker is a year-round resident throughout its range.

=== Feeding ===
The rufous-winged woodpecker usually forages alone, but sometimes in pairs and occasionally as part of a mixed species feeding flock. It forages at most levels of the forest, favoring the interior. It mostly feeds by pecking into the substrate. Its diet includes ants and adult and larval beetles.

=== Breeding ===
The rufous-winged woodpecker's breeding season is from February to May. It excavates a nest hole in recently dead or rotten wood, usually between 2.5 and 5 m (8 and 16 ft) above the ground. The clutch size is two to four eggs. The incubation period, time to fledging, and details of parental care are not known.

=== Vocal and non-vocal sounds ===
The rufous-winged woodpecker's song is "a vigorous, jay-like chea, chea, chea, chea" also described as a "loud, emphatic series of slightly nasal downslurred 'heew' notes. It drums "in long bursts".

== Status ==
The IUCN has assessed the rufous-winged woodpecker as being of Least Concern. It has a large range and an estimated population of at least 50,000 mature individuals, though the latter is believed to be decreasing. No immediate threats have been identified. It is considered "uncommon to fairly common" and occurs in two protected areas in Costa Rica.
