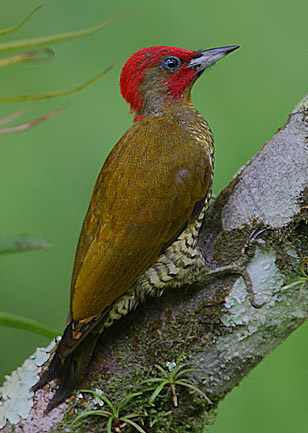
- Adult male rufous-winged woodpecker (Piculus simplex)

Scientific classification
- Kingdom: Animalia
- Phylum: Chordata
- Class: Aves
- Order: Piciformes
- Family: Picidae
- Tribe: Picini
- Genus: Piculus; Spix, 1824

Type species
- Piculus macrocephalus von Spix, 1824

Species
- See text

= Piculus =

Genus of birds

Piculus is a genus of birds in the woodpecker family Picidae that are found in Central and South America.

== Taxonomy ==
The genus was introduced by the German naturalist Johann Baptist von Spix in 1824. The type species was subsequently designated as the golden-green woodpecker (Piculus chrysochloros) by the American ornithologist Harry C. Oberholser in 1923. The generic name is a diminutive of the Latin word Picus meaning "woodpecker".

The genus forms part of the woodpecker subfamily Picinae and has a sister relationship to the genus Dryocopus whose species are found in Eurasia and the Americas. The genus Piculus is a member of the tribe Picini and belongs to a clade that contains five genera: Colaptes, Piculus, Mulleripicus, Dryocopus and Celeus.

The genus contains seven species:

Image	Scientific name	Common name	Distribution
	Piculus simplex	Rufous-winged woodpecker	Costa Rica, Honduras, Nicaragua and Panama. Formerly considered to be a subspecies of the white-throated woodpecker.
	Piculus callopterus	Stripe-cheeked woodpecker	Panama. Formerly considered to be a subspecies of the white-throated woodpecker.
	Piculus litae	Lita woodpecker	western Colombia and northwestern Ecuador
	Piculus leucolaemus	White-throated woodpecker	The Amazon Basin, Brazil, mainly in Ecuador, Peru and Bolivia
	Piculus flavigula	Yellow-throated woodpecker	Brazil and the entire Amazon Basin; also in the Guianas, Bolivia, Colombia, Ecuador, French Guiana, Guyana, Peru, Suriname and Venezuela
	Piculus chrysochloros	Golden-green woodpecker	The Amazon Basin in the countries of Argentina, Bolivia, Brazil, Ecuador, French Guiana, Guyana, Paraguay, Peru and Suriname
	Piculus aurulentus	Yellow-browed woodpecker	Argentina, Brazil and Paraguay.

Five other species, formerly placed here, are now in Colaptes.
