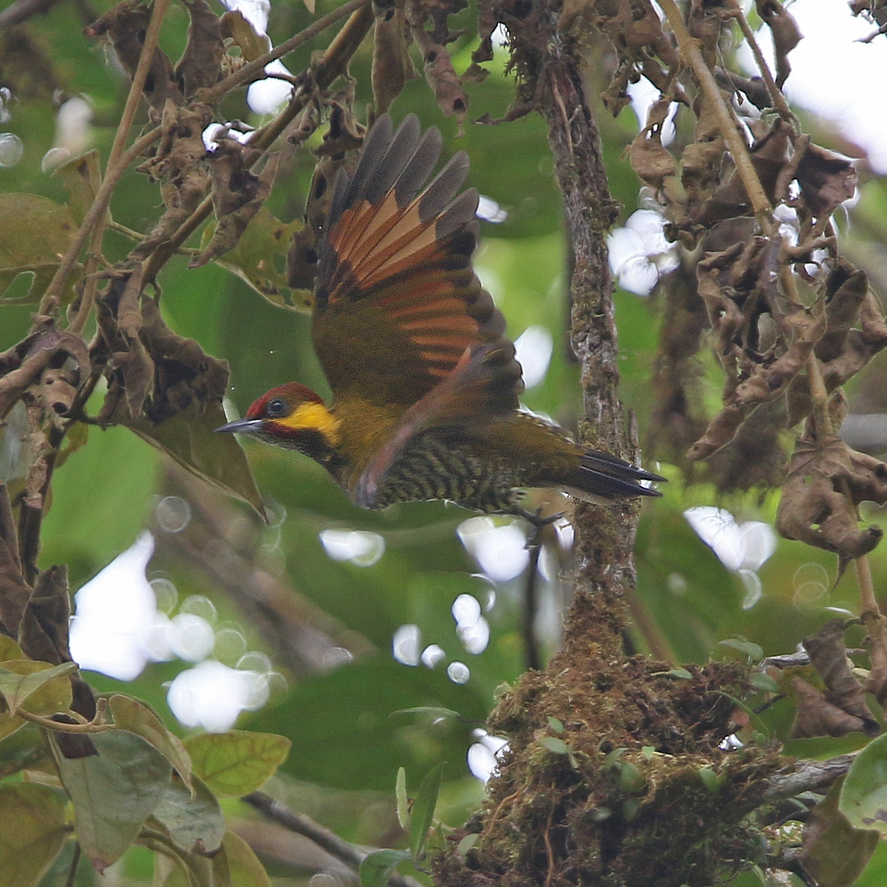

Conservation status
- Least Concern (IUCN 3.1)

Scientific classification
- Kingdom: Animalia
- Phylum: Chordata
- Class: Aves
- Order: Piciformes
- Family: Picidae
- Genus: Piculus
- Species: P. litae

Binomial name
- Piculus litae (Rothschild, 1901)

= Lita woodpecker =

Species of bird

The Lita woodpecker (Piculus litae) is a species of bird in subfamily Picinae of the woodpecker family Picidae. It is found in Colombia and Ecuador.

== Taxonomy and systematics ==
The Lita woodpecker was originally described as Chloronerpes litae. Since its inclusion in Piculus it has at times been considered conspecific with the rufous-winged woodpecker (P. simplex), the stripe-cheeked woodpecker (P. callopterus), and the white-throated woodpecker (P. leucolaemus); the four may form a superspecies. It and just the white-throated woodpecker have also been treated as conspecific. The Lita woodpecker is monotypic.

== Description ==
The Lita woodpecker is about 17 to 18 cm (6.7 to 7.1 in) long. Males and females have the same plumage except on their heads. Males are red from forehead to hindneck and very widely on the malar (cheek); the rest of the face is golden-yellow. The female has red only on the nape and malar but is otherwise the same as the male. Adults of both sexes have a dusky olive chin and throat that appear blackish at a distance. Their upperparts are olive-yellow to bronze-green with a slightly darker rump. Their flight feathers are mostly dark brown with olive on the outer webs, pale cinnamon-rufous on the inner webs, and black tips. Their tail is blackish with greenish edges on the feathers. Their underparts are whitish with black wedge-shaped bars. Their shortish beak is light bluish with a black tip, their iris dark brown, and the legs dark slate blue. Juveniles are duller and greener than adults, have red only on the nape, and have a streaked throat.

== Distribution and habitat ==
The Lita woodpecker is found in Colombia in the middle Magdalena River Valley and the Pacific slope of the western Andes, and south into northwestern Ecuador to Pichincha Province. It inhabits the interior and edges of humid and wet primary forest and also secondary forest. In elevation it ranges from about sea level to 800 m (2,600 ft).

== Behavior ==
=== Movement ===
As far as is known, the Lita woodpecker is a year-round resident throughout its range.

=== Feeding ===
The Lita woodpecker forages from the forest's middle levels to the sub-canopy, usually by itself and sometimes in pairs. Its diet has not been studied but is assumed to be adult and larval insects.

=== Breeding ===
Almost nothing is known about the Lita woodpecker's breeding biology. Excavation of and attendance at apparent nest holes have been observed in July and August.

=== Vocalization ===
The Lita woodpecker makes "[h]issing 'shreeyr' or 'peessh'" calls that are very similar to those of other Piculus woodpeckers.

== Status ==
The IUCN has assessed the Lita woodpecker as being of Least Concern. It has a fairly large range, but its population size is not known and is believed to be decreasing. No immediate threats have been identified. "Extensive deforestation has occurred in range, and appears to be continuing unabated. In view of this, and the very small range, species should perhaps be considered Near-threatened."
