= Elsie Naumburg =

American ornithologist

- Born: Elsie Margaret Binger; July 7, 1880
- Died: November 25, 1953 (age 73)
- Occupation: Ornithologist
- Spouses: Victor Reichenberger; Walter Wehle Naumburg
- Parent(s): Frances Newgass Binger; Gustav Binger
- Family: Elkan Naumburg (father-in-law); Walter D. Binger (brother); Carl Binger (brother)

Elsie Margaret Binger Naumburg (7 July 1880, New York City, NY, US – 25 November 1953) was an American ornithologist.

== Biography ==
Naumburg was born to a Jewish family in New York City, the daughter of Frances (née Newgass) and Gustav Binger. She had three brothers: Robert Binger, Walter D. Binger, and Carl Binger. She studied at the Sachs Institute at the University of Frankfurt am Main and at the Ludwig-Maximilians-Universität München, and studied with Carl Edward Hellmayr for several years. On returning to the United States she joined the staff of the Bird Department at the American Museum of Natural History, under Frank Chapman. She specialized in South American birds.

Naumburg's most important work was on the birds of the Mato Grosso, based on collections made by George Kruck Cherrie during the Roosevelt–Rondon Scientific Expedition led by Theodore Roosevelt and Cândido Rondon. She later employed Emil Kaempfer to collect birds in southeastern Brazil.

Naumburg married Victor Reichenberger in 1908, and some of her early publications were under that name. Reichenberger died in 1913, and she married Walter W. Naumburg in 1923.

== Works ==
- "The birds of Matto Grosso, Brazil. A report on the birds secured by the Roosevelt-Rondon expedition" New York (1930).
- "Gazetteer and Maps Showing Collecting Stations Visited by Emil Kaempfer in Eastern Brazil and Paraguay" Bulletin of the American Museum of Natural History, Volume 68, Art. 6, pp. 449–469 (1935).
- "Studies of Birds from Eastern Brazil and Paraguay, Based on a Collection Made by Emil Kaempfer" Bulletin of the American Museum of Natural History, Volume 74, Art. 3: 139–205 (1937).
- "Studies of Birds from Eastern Brazil and Paraguay, Based on a Collection Made by Emil Kaempfer (Concluding part of the study of the Formicariidae)" Bulletin of the American Museum of Natural History, Volume 76, Art. 6: 231–276 (1939).
