= New York Landmarks Conservancy =

American nonprofit organization

The New York Landmarks Conservancy
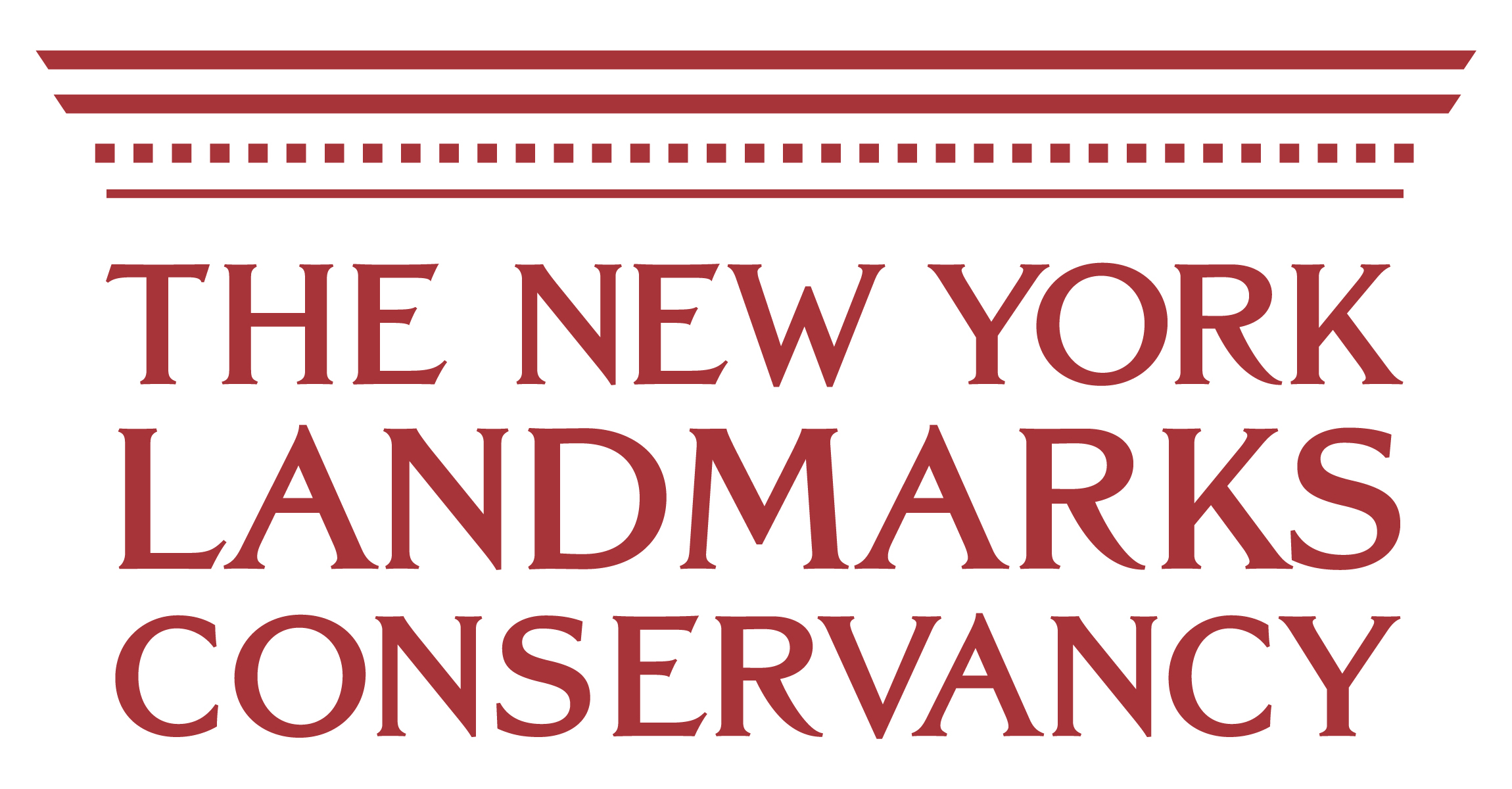
- Logo of the NYLC

- Location within Lower Manhattan
- Abbreviation: NYLC
- Formation: 1973; 53 years ago
- Purpose: Conservation and restoration of cultural property
- Headquarters: 1 Whitehall Street, New York City, NY 10004
- Location: United States
- Coordinates: 40°42′14″N 74°00′47″W
- Region served: New York
- President: Peg Breen
- Website: nylandmarks.org

The New York Landmarks Conservancy is a non-profit organization "dedicated to preserving and protecting" New York's unique architectural heritage. In addition to advocating for sound preservation laws and politics, the Conservancy provides financial and technical support for preservation.

Since its founding in 1973, it has provided grants and loans of more than $62 million to help people save their homes and communities, including cultural, religious and social service institutions. These funds have mobilized a total of more than $900 million for over 2,000 restoration projects that have revitalized neighborhoods, supported the economy and local jobs, and attracted tourists. Its restoration projects include the Alexander Hamilton U.S. Custom House, the Alice Austen House and the Weeksville Heritage Center. The New York Landmarks Conservancy's annual Lucy G. Moses Preservation award recognizes notable preservation efforts.

Peg Breen is president of the organization.

== Programs ==
The conservancy runs several programs:

- Its Technical Services Center provides "expert architectural and preservation advice to property owners, developers, and contractors."
- The Emergency Preservation Grant Program, largely funded by The New York Community Trust, provides funding to nonprofit organizations to address immediate repair needs and/or professional services to remedy dangerous exterior conditions (falling masonry, spot water leakage, etc.) and/or deteriorated interior structural elements of buildings. Most grants range between $10,000 and $20,000 and are accompanied by project management assistance from Conservancy staff. It has given out 112 emergency grants to non-profit organizations for a total of $1,185,016.
- Its Sacred Sites Program "provides congregations throughout New York State with matching grants for planning and implementing exterior restoration projects, technical assistance, and workshops." Started in 1986, it has provided almost $14.5 million in over 1,700 matching grants to almost 900 religious institutions.
- Its Historic Properties Fund provides loans with project management assistance ranging between $80,000 and $300,000 for exterior work or structural repairs on historic properties in New York City at generally below-market rates. Started in 1982, the Fund has approximately $10 million in assets as of year-end 2024 and has made loans totaling more than $34 million and grants of $470,000 for restoration work on 283 properties.
- Its Nonprofit Technical Assistance Grant Program (NTAG) provides grants of up to $30,000 to nonprofit organizations to retain historic exterior details of both landmark and non-landmark buildings that are architecturally significant throughout New York City. Since being established in 1986, the program has provided over $1.6 million in grants and loans for restoration work on 83 properties. The program focuses on nonprofit organizations that work in low and moderate-income communities.

== Selected projects ==
- U.S. Custom House – As its first challenge, the conservancy took on determining the fate of the U.S. Custom House on Bowling Green (New York City). Left vacant by the U.S. Customs Service after its 1973 move to the World Trade Center, the Beaux-Arts palace faced an uncertain future. The project to convert the Custom House to new uses was conducted by the conservancy with cooperation of the U.S. General Services Administration and sponsored by the Custom House Institute, an organization formed by a group of downtown businessman. The conservancy was empowered by the G.S.A. to direct efforts to develop plans for the preservation and reuse of the building. More than two decades after it was vacated, the restored Custom House took on a new life when the National Museum of the American Indian's George Gustav Heye Center with its collection of native artifacts opened in the public spaces in 1994.
- Fraunces Tavern Block (Pearl Street – Lower Manhattan) – The conservancy worked to stop the demolition of five 19th-century commercial buildings on the Fraunces Tavern Block. The organization convinced the Department of Buildings to issue a temporary stop work order on May 20, 1974 while the conservancy assumed a proactive role in efforts to develop economically viable plans for the row of buildings. These efforts included feasibility studies, designation as an historic district, negotiations with city agencies, reuse proposals, and special zoning legislation. In 1978 the conservancy was successful in obtaining funds to purchase the five buildings and the row was leased to a private developer for conversion to residential and commercial use which is still in use today.

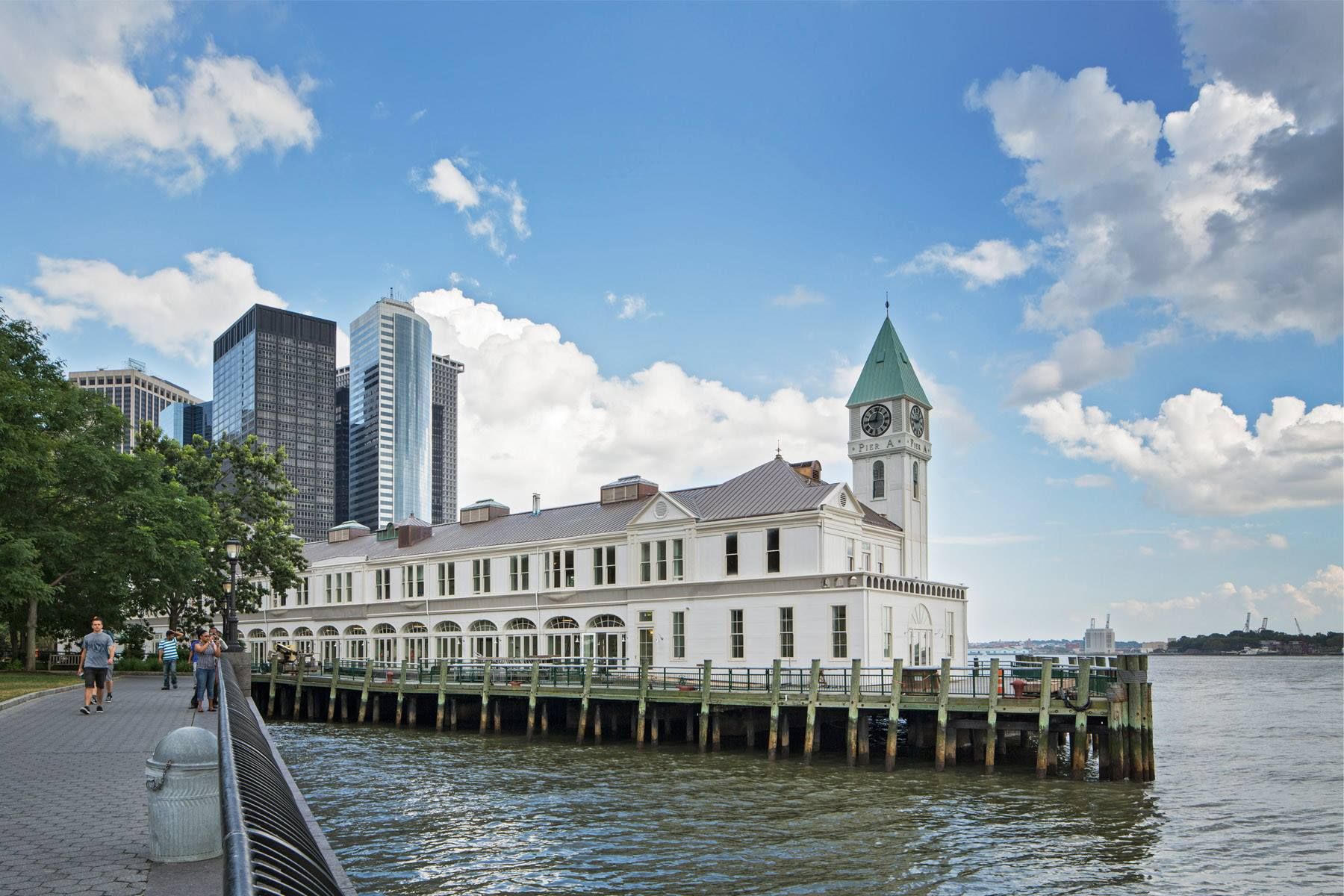
Pier A, Battery Park - Lower Manhattan

- Pier A – When Pier A was threatened with demolition by the Battery Park City Authority to make way for landfill in 1975 the conservancy secured local landmark designation and the listing of the 1886 fireboat station on the National Register of Historic Places. This made possible a federal grant, matched by New York State funds, for the preparation of an historic structures report. Unused for years while plans were stalled by financial problems, this outstanding example of Victorian architecture and innovative engineering has now been redeveloped. It will reopen in early 2015 as a restaurant Pier A Harbor House.
- Public Buildings Inventory – In 1977 the New York Landmarks Conservancy released its Public Buildings Inventory. This inventory documented 760 federal, state, and city owned buildings of architectural interest in New York City. Each of the buildings were photographed and cataloged.
- Federal Archive Building (at the corner of Greenwich and Christopher Streets) – In the mid-1970s the conservancy took on the enormous task of determining the future of the vacant Federal Archive Building in Greenwich Village. At the request of the U.S. General Services Administration, the conservancy directed the project: conducting a feasibility study, consulting with federal, state and city agencies and the local community board; exploring legal and economic issue; soliciting and reviewing redevelopment proposals; and selecting a developer. The Federal Archive Building was then leased for residential and commercial conversion to a group co-sponsored by the conservancy. The conservancy came up with a unique and innovative proposal for meeting the requirements of the law that stated revenues were to be used for public preservation purposes. The conservancy's proposal was to establish a revolving loan fund for historic preservation. This required the developer of the building to capitalize the fund by making contributions totaling over $6 million, which would be administered by the conservancy and the City of New York. This boost in financing marked the beginning of the conservancy's Historic Properties fund.
- Ellis Island Immigrant Hospital, South Side of Ellis Island – In the mid 90s, the conservancy secured endangerment listings by the World Monuments Fund and the National Trust for Historic Preservation. The conservancy helped found Save Ellis Island, Inc., in 2001. A nonprofit dedicated to raising the funds necessary to see all thirty vacant buildings on Ellis Island restored and appropriately reused. By June 2006, all 29 of the unrestored former hospital buildings on Ellis Island were stabilized.
- Astor Row – Harlem – In the early 1880s, William Astor built 28, semi-attached row houses on 130th Street between Fifth and Lenox Avenues in Harlem. Each double building shared a turned-wood porch in the Victorian style. Although the buildings were designated as city landmarks in 1981, by 1990, most of the porches were gone or in serious disrepair. In a tour through Upper Manhattan at that time, Brooke Astor came upon Astor Row and commenced a substantial financial commitment to restore and place the porches. In the next few years, the now-dissolved Vincent Astor Foundation awarded $1.7 million to the Landmarks Conservancy to carry out this endeavor. Currently, all but three of the 28 buildings have been the recipients of new or improved porches. Importantly, the Astor Row Porch Project stimulated enormous investment in the block. The conservancy converted two vacant buildings into an eight-unit, limited-equity cooperative. Other vacant buildings were renovated and became habitable. Two City-owned buildings have moved into private hands, and several owners have upgraded their properties. Community preservation at its finest.
- Prospect Cemetery in Jamaica, Queens, and the Chapel of the Sisters – The conservancy has been a partner since 1999 in the Prospect Cemetery Revitalization Initiative, along with two other nonprofit organizations (Greater Jamaica Development Corporation and Prospect Cemetery Association) and the cemetery's owner of record, the City of New York Department of Parks & Recreation. Over $2.2 million in public and private funds were raised in this time to secure the four-acre site, which is a city-designated landmark and National Register-listed property; restore its 1857 Chapel of the Sisters which now serves as a venue for jazz concerts and other events; clear the grounds of years of vegetative growth and undesirable trees; in 2013 plant the entire cemetery with slow-growing, no-mowing, low maintenance grass; and conserve the oldest and most important markers. Prospect Cemetery was founded in 1668 and the oldest headstones date to the early 18th century. Revolutionary War heroes and early New York statesmen are buried there. There are some 2000 markers in the four-acre site, which is a city landmark and listed on the National Register of Historic Places.
- Upper Manhattan Historic Preservation Fund – UMHPF has awarded grants and loans totaling $4 million to 30 projects. The Upper Manhattan Empowerment Zone (UMEZ) created UMHPF in 1999 to assist historic properties in Harlem, Inwood, and Washington Heights.
- Lower Manhattan Emergency Preservation Fund – The Landmarks Conservancy formed a special emergency fund with partner groups immediately after 9/11 to help restore landmark buildings damaged that day. The "Lower Manhattan Emergency Preservation Fund" awarded almost $80,000 for seven restoration projects. Those included three residential buildings at 55 Liberty Street, 120 Greenwich Street, and a Murray Street cast iron building; Century 21 Department Store; St. Peter's Roman Catholic Church; the South Street Seaport Museum; and the Verizon Building. The ships at the South Street Seaport Museum were enveloped in the cloud of debris that drifted eastward when the towers collapsed. A $10,000 grant supplemented the museum's insurance so that the ships could be properly cleaned.
- Survivors Staircase – The Landmarks Conservancy also worked to save the Survivors Staircase, where hundreds of people fled to safety during the attacks on 9/11. The conservancy originally hoped to have the Staircase remain in place. But they accepted a State-offered compromise where the stairs and treads were moved to the memorial museum. The conservancy paid noted preservation engineer Robert Silman to design how to move the steps, a complex process of cutting them out of concrete; bracing them on a specially designed steel "cradle" and lifting them from the northeast section of Ground Zero to the museum site.
- Congregation Tifereth Israel (Corona, Queens) – Tifereth Israel, constructed in 1911, is the oldest synagogue in Queens. Designated a New York City Landmark in 2008, this wooden building is a rare survivor of the earliest, vernacular synagogues and was designed in the Gothic and Moorish revival styles by Crescent L. Varrone. Since 1997 The New York Landmarks Conservancy has provided financial, technical and project management assistance to the congregation for a comprehensive $1.6 million restoration.
