= Ellis Island Immigrant Hospital =

Former public hospital in New York Harbor

Ellis Island
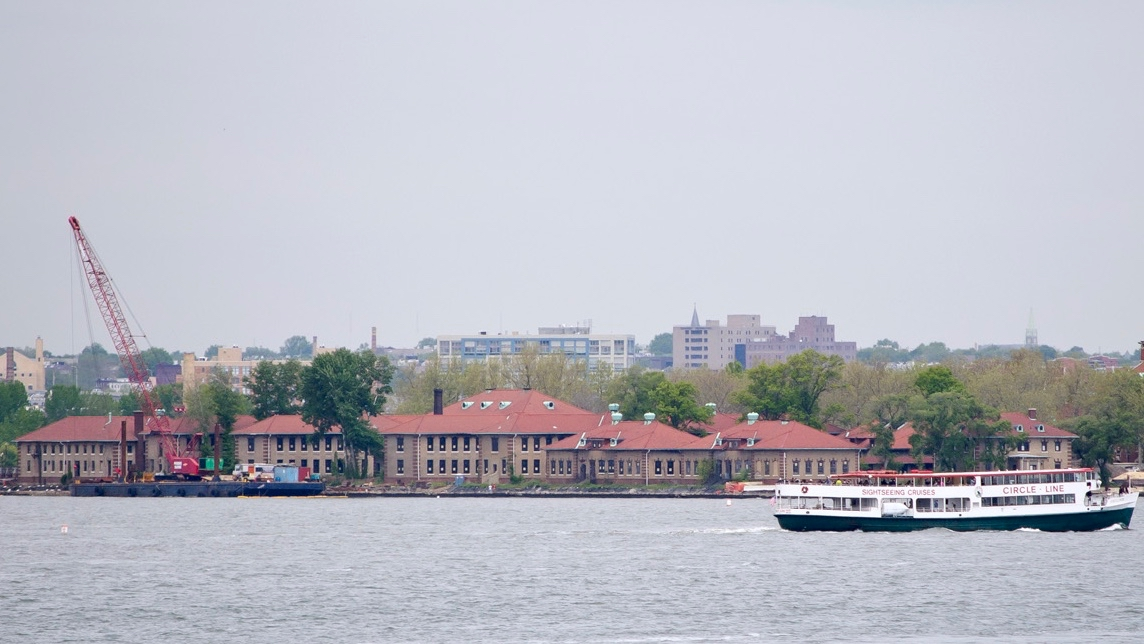
- Ellis Island Immigrant Hospital

- Location in Port of New York and New Jersey Ellis Island Immigrant Hospital (New Jersey) Ellis Island Immigrant Hospital (the United States)
- 40°41′58.4″N 74°2′22.5″W
- Location: Ellis Island; Jersey City, New Jersey, U.S., in New York Harbor

History
- Built: 1900

Site notes
- Elevation: 7 ft (2.1 m)
- Architectural style: Georgian Revival
- Governing body: National Park Service
- Website: https://www.nps.gov/elis/index.htm

U.S. National Register of Historic Places
- Official name: Statue of Liberty National Monument, Ellis Island and Liberty Island
- Designated: October 15, 1966
- Reference no.: 66000058

U.S. National Monument
- Official name: Statue of Liberty National Monument
- Designated: added October 15, 1965

The Ellis Island Immigrant Hospital (also known as USPHS Hospital No. 43) was a United States Public Health Service hospital on Ellis Island, in New York Harbor, that operated from 1902 to 1951. The hospital is part of the Statue of Liberty National Monument. While the monument is managed by the National Park Service as part of the National Parks of New York Harbor office, the south side of Ellis Island, including the hospital, is managed by the non-profit Save Ellis Island Foundation and has been off-limits to the general public since its closing in 1954.

Constructed in phases, the facility encompassed both a general hospital and a separate pavilion-style contagious disease hospital. The hospital had two functions: treating immigrants who were ill upon arrival, and treating immigrants with conditions that were prohibited by immigration laws. These latter patients were stabilized and often sent back to their home countries. Between 1902 and 1951 the hospitals treated over 360,000 patients of whom 300,000 were admitted. There were approximately 3,000 fatalities and 399 babies were born there.

The immigrant hospital was run by the Marine Hospital Service, which was re-organized and expanded in 1902 and became the Public Health and Marine Hospital Service. The name was shortened in 1912 and became the United States Public Health Service (PHS). All of the doctors at Ellis Island were part of the commissioned corps of the United States Public Health Service. Nurses and all other medical personnel were employees of the PHS. The PHS doctors conducted the line inspection, the medical examination of arriving immigrants, and treated detained immigrants in the hospitals.

Efforts to restore the hospital buildings and other structures on the island are being made by the Save Ellis Island Foundation. The hospital complex has been open to the public on a limited basis for hard hat tours since 2014, provided by the Save Ellis Island Foundation.

== History ==
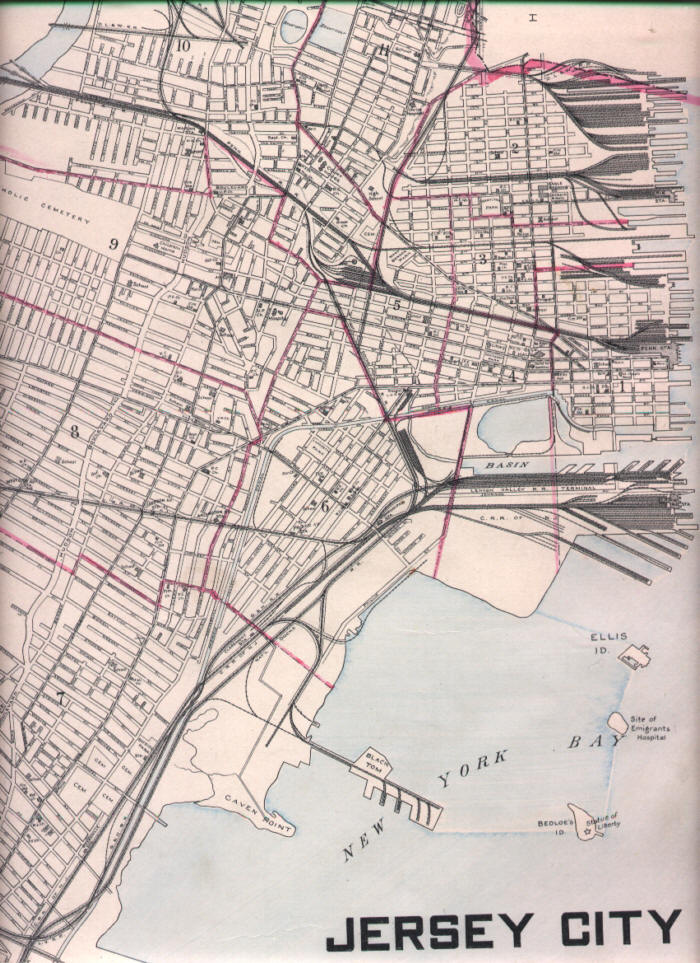
Early 20th-century map showing the "Site of Emigrants Hospital"

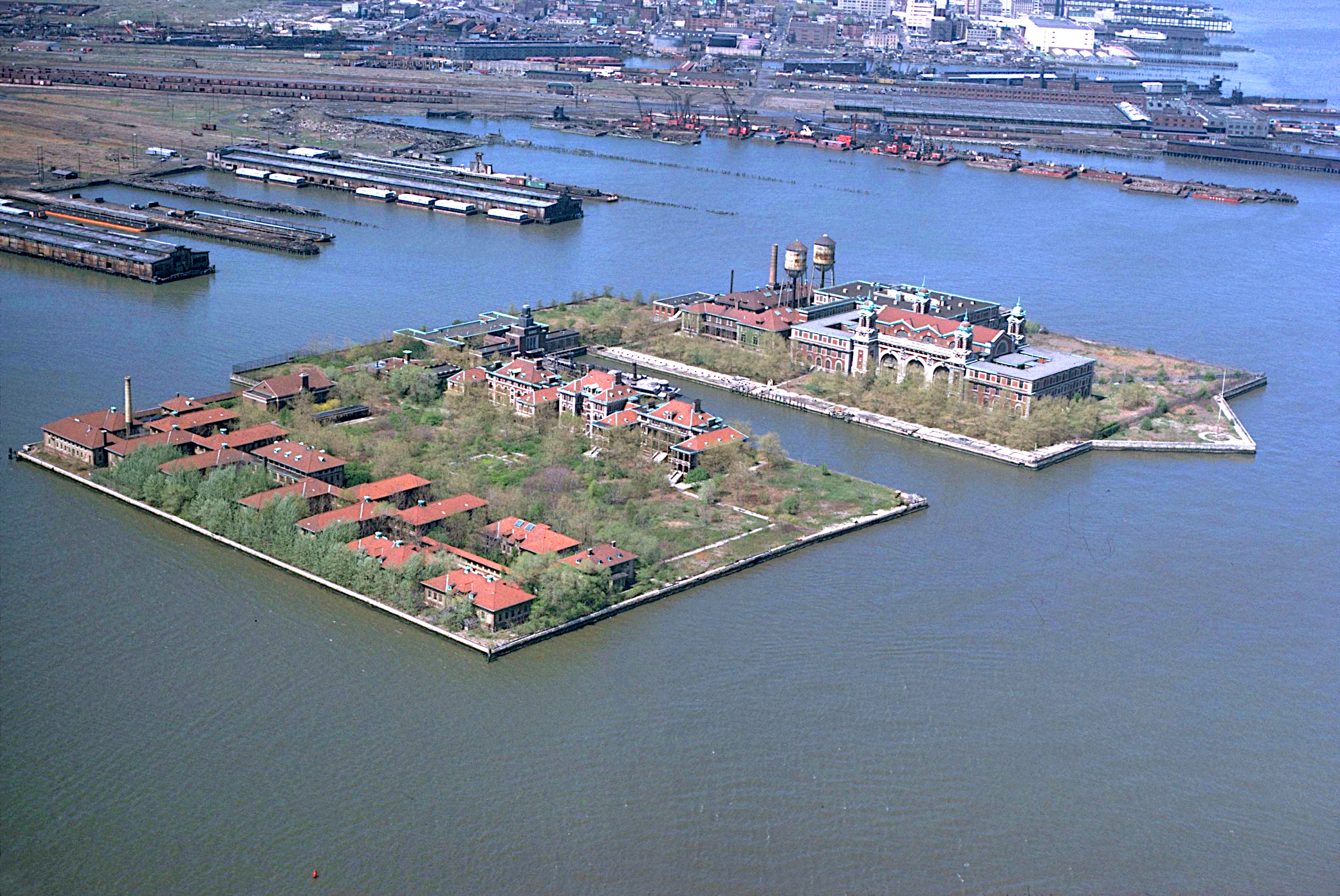
Ellis Island as seen from the air in the early 1970s, with the hospital at the southern (left) side of the island which had been created with landfill

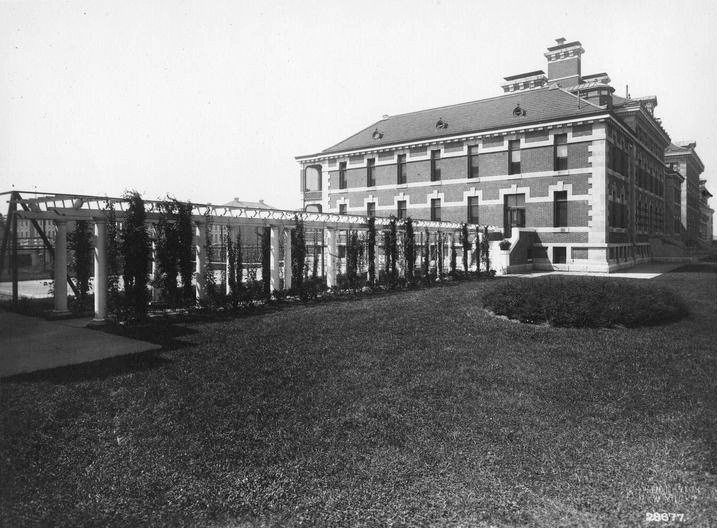
View of the hospital

=== Need ===
Prior to being an immigration station, Ellis Island was the site of Fort Gibson, an 18th-century fort which was part of the New York Harbor defenses along with the Battery, Fort Wood on Bedloe's Island, and Fort Jay on Governors Island. By the late 19th century, Fort Gibson was obsolete and the island was used by the Navy to store munitions.

The need for hospitals as part of the immigration process was well-established when the new Ellis Island Immigration Station opened. In the 1860s (when immigration was administered by the states), New York State sent sick immigrants from the main entrance facility at Castle Clinton in the Battery to a separate purpose-built and very effective new hospital facility. The Verplanck State Emigrant Hospital on Ward's Island, which opened in 1864 was constructed in the pavilion style, a hygienic layout promoted by Florence Nightingale in her Notes On Hospitals and hailed by the New York Times as the exemplar of a modern hospital.

As the number of immigrants increased, it was decided that the US government had to take control of immigration. In 1882 the US government passed the Immigration Act of 1882. It excluded any immigrant who was "likely to become a public charge" (LPC), effectively denying entrance to prospective immigrants who could not demonstrate their ability to work and would require government assistance to survive. The law also barred immigrants who were convicts, those convicted of political offenses or who were "idiots, psychopathics, or afflicted with a loathsome infectious or contagious disease". It also established a head tax to be paid to the federal government, which replaced one charged by New York State, which was declared unconstitutional in 1875 as per Henderson v. Mayor of City of New York, 92 U.S. 259. The local administration, however, was to be carried out by state officers designated by the various states involved.

The Immigration Act of 1891 formalized previous immigration laws and gave full authority to the US government, including the ability to enforce the laws and to deport immigrants who did not meet the requirements. The Marine Hospital Service, later renamed the US Public Health Service, was charged with administering the new immigration laws for the federal government.

=== First immigration station ===
The original immigration station on Ellis Island opened January 1, 1892. It was built reusing several of the structures from Fort Gibson. A shellhouse was converted into a hospital for the insane, the gunners quarters became the surgeon's house, a shellhouse became a dining hall and another shellhouse became a detention facility for immigrants awaiting deportation. A 40-bed hospital was constructed from "a series of wooden structures surrounding a garden".

In 1890 when the US government and the State of New York processed immigrants jointly at the Barge Office (a US government-owned facility), patients with contagious diseases were sent to hospitals operated by the New York City Department of Health and to Long Island College Hospital in Brooklyn, which was then also called the Immigrant Hospital. The hospitals involved were called “Contract Hospitals.”

=== Reconstruction and expansion ===
==== New hospital on Island 2 ====
On June 15, 1897, the wooden immigration station on Ellis Island was destroyed by fire. The Buffalo Evening News reported that all 40 patients were safely evacuated and taken to Bellevue Hospital. By September, the treasury's supervising architect, James Knox Taylor, opened an architecture competition to rebuild the immigration station. The competition was the second to be conducted under the Tarsney Act of 1893, which had permitted private architects to design federal buildings, rather than government architects in the supervising architect's office. By December, it was announced that Edward Lippincott Tilton and William A. Boring had won the competition. Tilton and Boring's plan called for four new structures: a main immigration processing facility in the French Renaissance style, as well as the kitchen and laundry building, main powerhouse, and the main hospital building The plan also included the creation of a new island (Island 2), upon which the hospital would be built, south of the existing island (Island 1).

The Main Immigration Building and structures on Island 1 were completed and opened in December 1900. Work creating Island 2 was completed in 1898. Work then started on the hospital and other buildings. The new hospital (Hospital Building No. 1) was built between February 1900 and March 1901 and included an outbuilding and a surgeon's house. "The hospital outbuilding included a laundry, linen room, and autopsy room. The surgeon's house was designed and constructed with a basement; a parlor, kitchen, pantry, dining room, library, and hall on the first floor; and five bedrooms, hall, and bath on the second floor." Work on these buildings was completed at the end of 1901, but they did not open until 1902 because of delays during construction.

The immigrant hospital was initially staffed by the Marine Hospital Service, which became the U.S. Public Health Service PHS). It was one of the first facilities in the country to employ a full-time female physician, Rose A. Bebb. Physicians treated a wide range of disease, from measles, tuberculosis, trachoma, scarlet fever, Favus, and diphtheria, to tropical diseases imported from around the world. The hospital was an extremely effective institution. Its mortality rate was on par or better than most comparable hospitals. In 1917, Wilson, a PHS physician stationed at Ellis Island, conducted a study of the hospitals. He wrote that "Although the incidence of cross-infection contracted in hospital has not entirely ceased, it has reached such a low point (for the past year 0.63 percent of all admissions) that it is believed a description of the hospital, with special reference to the provisions to prevent the spread of disease, will be found interesting and instructive."

The PHS used advanced methods in medicine as they developed. They used fluoroscopy and x-rays; there was an autoclave that could sterilize four mattresses at a time. For many immigrants, new medical equipment was unfamiliar and scary. According to one New York Times article, "those less fortunate had to submit to physical inspections that required stripping off all of one's clothing – an entirely foreign concept, particularly to many immigrant women. This is why there were female physicians stationed on the medical inspection line. Some immigrants had no idea what X-ray machines did; others were fearful that their clothing – or the money sewn inside its seams – would be stolen."

The volume of immigrants quickly overwhelmed Hospital 1's capacity of 125 beds. As the number of immigrants increased, the number of "psychopathic" or "insane" patients grew as well. Because their entry in the US was prohibited by immigration law and because these patients needed to be housed in a separate facility, a new secure ward was required. The psychopathic ward, situated between the hospital outbuilding and the main hospital on Island 2, opened in 1907. The administration building was added in 1906–1907, which added another 125 beds. However, the number of immigrants nearly doubled (from 493,267 in 1902 to 1,004,756 in 1907), leaving the hospitals still extremely overcrowded. Between 1908 and 1909, a third building was constructed that has several names, originally called the hospital extension it was renamed Hospital Number 2 because it was almost the same size and layout as the first hospital. It had a capacity of 125 beds. When it opened it enabled the PHS to distribute patients to hospitals 1 and 2 and use the administration building for its original purpose. When Hospital 2 was completed, the facility had a capacity of 300 beds.

==== Contagious disease hospital on Island 3 ====
Hospital No. 1 was designed as a general hospital. The PHS intended there to be a companion, separate contagious hospital, as was the practice in the civilian hospitals, such as Johns Hopkins Hospital, after which Ellis Island's hospitals were modeled, but the government would not fund a contagious hospital. With no facilities to treat infectious or contagious disease patients on site, Ellis Island maintained its contract hospital relationship with the Health Department of New York and Long Island College Hospitals which had been caring for Ellis Island contagious disease patients since 1890. In 1903 New York announced that it wanted to terminate the agreement because the number of patients being sent to New York strained their capacity. The Bureau of Immigration considered the most practical solution was to build a third island, separated from Island 2 by a ferry basin. In response, the surgeon general indicated that an island "with an outside limit of 410 feet from the present island and with 200 feet of clear water space between the two islands, would be amply sufficient to ensure freedom from danger of contagion according to modern ideas of hospital construction. Contemporary hospital design and medical knowledge indicated that a single building was less desirable than a series of several small pavilions, where various diseases could be treated in isolation from other wards." The island measured 4.75 acres (1.92 ha). The ferry basin was later infilled.

The area chosen was between Island 2 and Liberty Island and adjacent to the Jersey City waterfront area known locally as Black Tom. Infill and construction was started but New Jersey claimed title to the area and New York and New Jersey went to court over this riparian rights issue. The government would not permit construction to continue until the land issue was resolved. In 1904, the courts ruled and determined that the location of the proposed Island 3 was indeed part of New York. The immigration department now had clear title and construction was resumed, By the end of 1909 island 3 and the new contagious disease hospitals were completed, but insufficient funds had been allocated to connect the utilities and purchase furniture and equipment for the facility. Congressional authorization for the required funds was not achieved until 1911 and the hospitals opened later that year.

The Island 3 buildings included eight two-story-pavilions designated for measles patients, three isolation wards, a morgue and autopsy building, a medical office building; and a three-story administrative building that contained the admitting and discharge facilities, residences for nurses, single doctors, and a small operating room. New York then officially terminated its contract with the Bureau of Immigration and all patients arriving at Ellis Island were treated either in the general hospital or the contagious disease hospital. 1912 was the first full year that the hospital complex was completely open.

==== 1912–1917 ====
When completed, the Ellis Island Hospital held 750 beds, 450 in the Contagious Disease Hospital and 300 in the General Hospital. A "Psychopathic Ward" housed 20–30 male and female patients. Island 2 had a maternity ward to deliver the 350 children born at Ellis Island. The maternity/obstetric facilities moved as the hospital expanded, but were first located on the third floor of the Administrative Building on Island 2. The general hospital building held three separate operating rooms and even dental offices. In 1914 when the hospital became fully operational, over 10,000 patients from 75 different countries were treated.

The hospitals used the most advanced methods in medicine for the time. In 1912 the PHS installed a full-scale laboratory, an offshoot of their former laboratory on Staten Island. That PHS Lab, and its pioneering work on germs and germ theory, was moved to Washington, D.C. in 1891 and renamed the National Institutes of Health. At the time, the PHS was the premier agency involved in containing infectious diseases.

History has rendered a number of these cutting-edge medical practices obsolete, even offensive. For example, now-discredited eugenic beliefs played a small role at the hospital. Henry H. Goddard established an intelligence testing program on Ellis Island in 1913. Doctors would use metal calipers to measure the circumference of immigrants' heads, and immigrants of “superior racial stock” were often favored when entering the United States. Additionally, many immigrants were detained at Ellis Island for mental illness and placed in the hospital's psychiatric ward. Some of the contemporary clinical classifications for mental illness are now archaic: idiot, imbecile, moron, or feeble-minded. It is likely that many of these diagnoses were the product of cultural differences, language barriers, or the immigrants' anxiety about entering a new country, which made their behavior seem slow or out of the ordinary to hospital doctors. In 1913, Howard Andrew Knox developed more objective testing methods to determine with increased accuracy whether an immigrant was mentally deficient. The Knox tests were effective in that they did not require specific cultural knowledge for successful performance.

In 1923, the Daughters of the American Revolution provided a robust occupational therapy program for immigrants detained at Ellis Island. In 1936, the PHS was asked to help with the treatment of World War I veterans, some of whom had shell shock. Because of the success of the DAR's occupational expertise, they were given an entire pavilion (Isolation Ward J) where they worked with U.S. servicemen, merchant seamen, and members of the U.S. Coast Guard and other U.S. government beneficiaries. This work continued until after World War II.

==== World War I: 1917–1920 ====
The hospitals were closed to immigrants for the first two years of World War I because immigration had virtually ceased due to wartime conditions. In 1917 the hospitals were officially taken over by the War Department and were renamed Debarkation Hospital #1. Their wartime mission was to treat wounded soldiers returning from Europe. The hospital was used to near capacity maintaining the same number of medical staff as it had prior to the War. The medical staff were all still commissioned officers in the PHS, but the facility was run by the War Department. The few immigrants who arrived were treated under contracts by hospitals in New York City.

Early in the US involvement in World War I the main facility at Ellis Island was used as an equipping and embarkation facility for the U.S. Navy. Sailors were brought to Ellis Island as they awaited the preparation of their ships for sea. PHS nurses who were being sent to Europe also passed through Ellis Island. They received their equipment and uniforms as well as final training prior to being shipped to hospitals in Europe. Initially quartered at Ellis Island, when the hospitals began to receive military casualties, the nurses were moved to hotels in New York City. Their training continued at Ellis Island.

In the spring of 1919 the hospital complex was returned to the Bureau of Immigration and the Public Health Service and was renamed Marine Hospital #43. Immigrants were once again processed at Ellis Island. By 1920 the number of immigrants arriving returned very close to prewar levels and the hospitals were treating similar numbers of patients.

==== 1920 to 1930 ====
According to the 1920 US Census, there were 124 PHS employees living on the Islands including seven doctors, two wives and four children. There were 36 nurses residing at Ellis, 24 female, 12 male. All the female nurses were single, some of the male nurses were married. There were a total of 35 doctors employed by the Public Health Service serving in 3 divisions: Boarding, Medical Inspection and Hospital. One of the Commissioned doctors was a woman. The hospital treated almost 9,000 patients a year.

During the 1920s, however, the US Congress began to change its immigration policy from an Open Door to a very closed door policy. New immigration laws were passed, explicitly to allow some immigration from Northern and Western Europe while severely restricting immigration from Southern and Eastern Europe. The “National Origins Act,” passed in 1924, established a 2% quota system which drastically reduced immigration from targeted countries. In 1921 over 560,000 immigrants passed through Ellis Island. This drastically reduced overall numbers of immigrants. In 1925, the first full year that the new law was in effect, only 137,000 immigrants were admitted through Ellis Island.

Almost overnight the Hospital Complex at Ellis Island held a fraction of the number of immigrant patients it had previously. As the number of immigrants patients decreased the PHS began to use the hospital as a Marine Hospital treating beneficiaries (employees of the US Public Health Service and their families, Merchant Mariners and Coast Guardsmen) as well as immigrants. The Hospital Complex always had the authorization to treat beneficiaries, but because the number of immigrants was so large and because they needed to have the capacity to treat an entire ship load of sick immigrants, the PHS seldom was able to treat beneficiaries.

The 1924 National Origins Act further reduced hospital demand by requiring immigrants to have a medical examination prior to boarding for America. This reduced the need for the Line Inspection at Ellis Island which was very efficient at processing volumes of immigrants but allowed many ill immigrants to enter. The doctors at Ellis Island were able to perform “Intensive Inspections” which were much longer and more thorough at the Immigration facility.

Under the new law the staff at Ellis Island was charged with a new task, inspection of Alien Merchant sailors arriving in New York. This practice started in 1926 and within a few months the PHS doctors were examining sailors at the rate of 600,000 a year. The largest concerns were tuberculosis and venereal disease.

In 1919, Ellis Island and its hospitals also served as immigration detentions centers after the US Government conducted the Palmer Raids. The Bureau of Investigation (the forerunner of the FBI) had begun rounding up immigrants across the country who had violated the terms of their admission either by becoming Public Charges, committing crimes or being identified as political dissidents – anarchists principally. These immigrants were called Warrant Cases and were shipped to Ellis Island via Jersey City on Deportation Trains. They were mostly held in secure areas of the main building on Island 1 awaiting deportation. If they were ill, they were taken to the hospitals on Islands 2 and 3. A number of measles wards on Island 3 were converted to secure wards. The 1920 Census records 24 anarchists being treated in the hospitals.

==== Ellis Island Committee Report ====
When President Franklin D. Roosevelt took office in 1933 Ellis Island was run by the Bureau of Immigration which was part of the Department of Labor. The facilities at Ellis Island were in such bad shape that President Roosevelt instructed the Secretary of Labor, Francis Perkins, to convene the Ellis Island Committee. Their mission was to evaluate the state of the facilities, to assess current immigration policy and to recommend actions to solve the problems that they identified. In 1934 the Ellis Island Committee submitted a report to Secretary Perkins confirming that current facilities were in disrepair and they were not adequate to fulfill the therapeutic and recreational needs of the patients.

The Roosevelt Administration acted on many of the recommendations. The projects that were completed on Islands 2 and 3 included: Completing and landscaping the infill of the area between Islands 2 and 3, for recreational and therapeutic use; adding a recreation shelter for the new lawn space; and construction of a Recreation Building. The Recreation Building replaced the Red Cross building which had been added in 1915, adjacent to Hospital Outbuilding and the corridor to the Ferry. It was a wooden structure that was too small and, by 1934, in very poor condition. The Recreation building was the largest new structure built. Constructed between Islands 2 and 3, it housed a full scale gymnasium and auditorium complete with stage, a film projection booth, a canteen and other recreational facilities. The Surgeon's house on Island 2 which had become a nurses residence was removed. The Surgeons and their families lived the Staff House on Island 3 and the nurses quarters were all moved the Administrative building on Island 3.

In addition to the new structures, extensive work was done on the Contagious Disease Hospital. Metal doors were added in the psychiatric wards. There were two maximum security psychiatric wards created by remodeling 2 measles wards, one for women and one for men. Specialized plumbing was added to the Tuberculosis wards. Much of the extant structures seen today are the result of these renovations.

The work was performed between 1934 and by the end of 1936 by two New Deal programs within the Department of Labor: the Public Works Administration and the New Deal of the Works Progress Administration. The conversion of the wards and other work was also done by these two agencies.

=== After closure ===
In 1954, the remaining parts of Ellis Island were closed and declared “excess federal property”. Despite redevelopment of Ellis Island's north side, the south side remained abandoned because of disagreements over its proposed use. The NPS held a competition for proposals to redevelop the south side in 1981. The NPS selected a plan for a conference center and a 250-to-300-room Sheraton hotel on the site of the hospital. In 1985, while restoration of the north side of Ellis Island was underway, Interior Secretary Donald P. Hodel convened a long-inactive federal commission to determine how the south side of Ellis Island should be used. Though the hotel proposal was dropped in 1986 for lack of funds, the NPS allowed developer William Hubbard to redevelop the south side as a convention center, though Hubbard was not able to find investors. The south side was proposed for possible future development even through the late 1990s.

In 1996, the World Monuments Fund listed the hospital as one of the world's 100 Most Endangered Properties, a warning echoed by the National Trust for Historic Preservation, which put the buildings on the list of “most endangered historical places in the United States.” A study conducted by the New York Landmarks Conservancy estimated that with about $3 million of federal funding, the Ellis Island Immigrant Hospital could be stabilized for the next 15 years. According to the Conservancy, that would allow time to develop a long-term preservation plan.

== Architecture ==
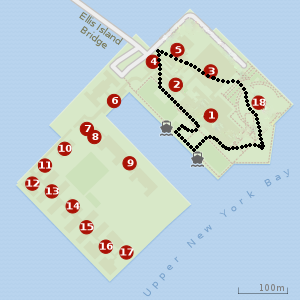
Buildings and structures at Ellis Island: 1. Main building; 2. Kitchen-laundry; 3. Baggage-dormitory; 4. Bakery-carpentry shop; 5. Powerhouse; 6. Ferry building; 7. Laundry-hospital outbuilding; 8. Psychopathic ward; 9. Main hospital building; 10. Recreation building and pavilion; 11. Office building; morgue; 12. Powerhouse and laundry; 13. Measles wards (A, C, G, E); 14. Administration building and kitchen; 15. Measles wards (B, D, F, H); 16. Isolation wards (I, K, L); 17. Staff House; 18. Wall of Honor

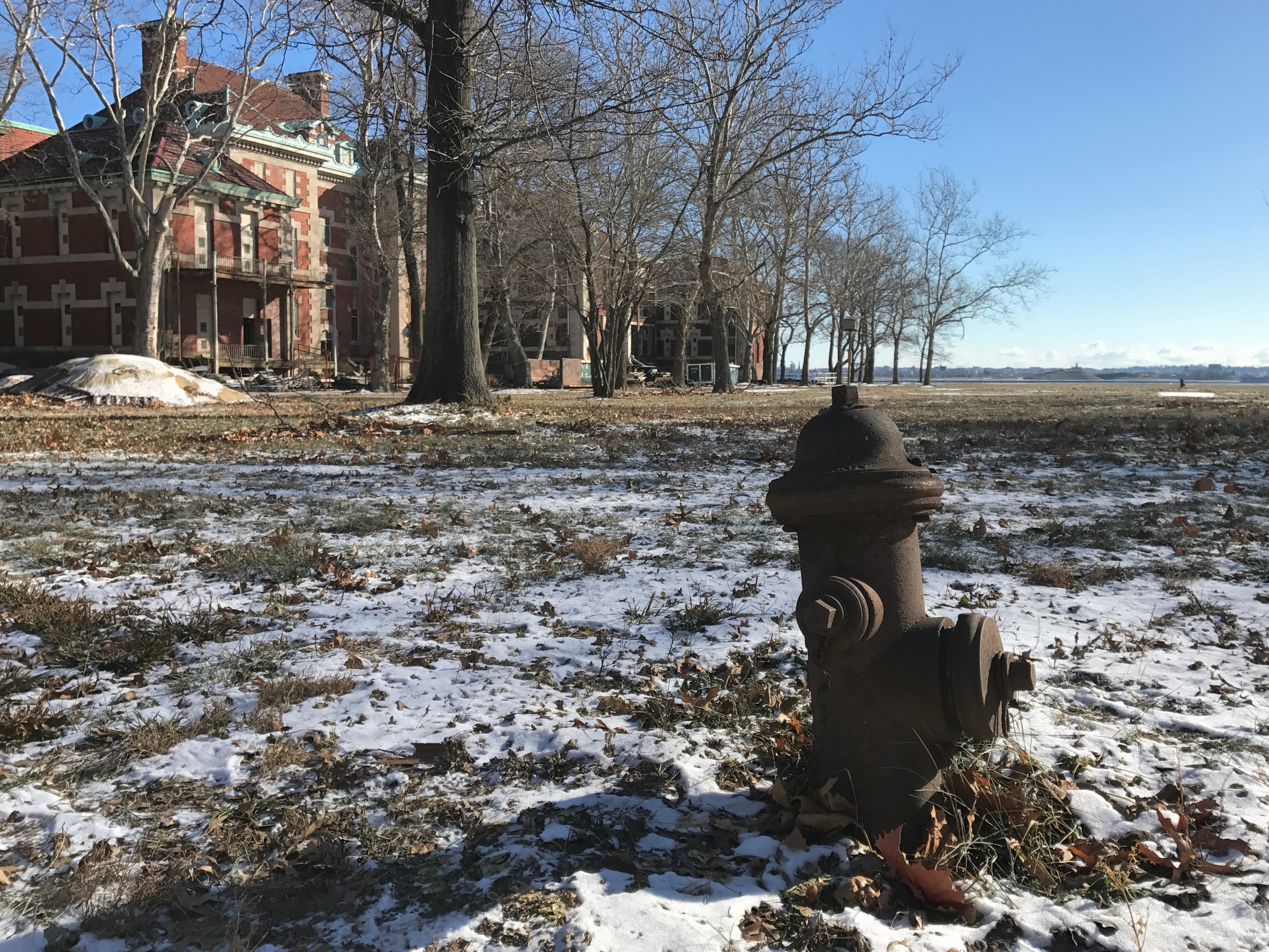
The lawn between islands 2 and 3. General hospital buildings on island 2 seen on the left.

The present day footprint of the island is 27.5 acres (11.1 ha) as opposed to the original 3.3-acre (1.3 ha) island. Though the current island's landmass was originally three separate islands, the Ellis Island Immigrant Hospital consisted of 22 buildings spread over the southern two islands. The islands were man-made, using excavated fill and concrete from the New York City Subway, as well as other building demolition spoils. The fill was retained with a system of wood piles and cribbing, and later encased with more than 7,700 linear feet of concrete and granite sea wall, placed atop either wood piles, cribbing, or submerged bags of concrete. Island 2 was created in 1899, and island 3 in 1906. The second ferry basin between islands 2 and 3 was infilled in the 1920s to create the great lawn. It was started by building the concrete and granite seawall to connect the tip of islands 2 and 3. The basin was subsequently filled to create the lawn.

A central corridor runs southward from the ferry building on the west side of the island. Two additional corridors split eastward down the centers of islands 2 and 3.

During its peak years, the hospital employed over 150 doctors, nurses, and other staff, many of whom lived in dormitories on the islands. According to the 1920 Census, 124 lived on the Islands. Red Cross workers also volunteered frequently, with a special focus on making the hospital more comfortable and enjoyable for the immigrant children. A hospital school taught children about personal hygiene, neatness, and good manners.

=== General hospital ===
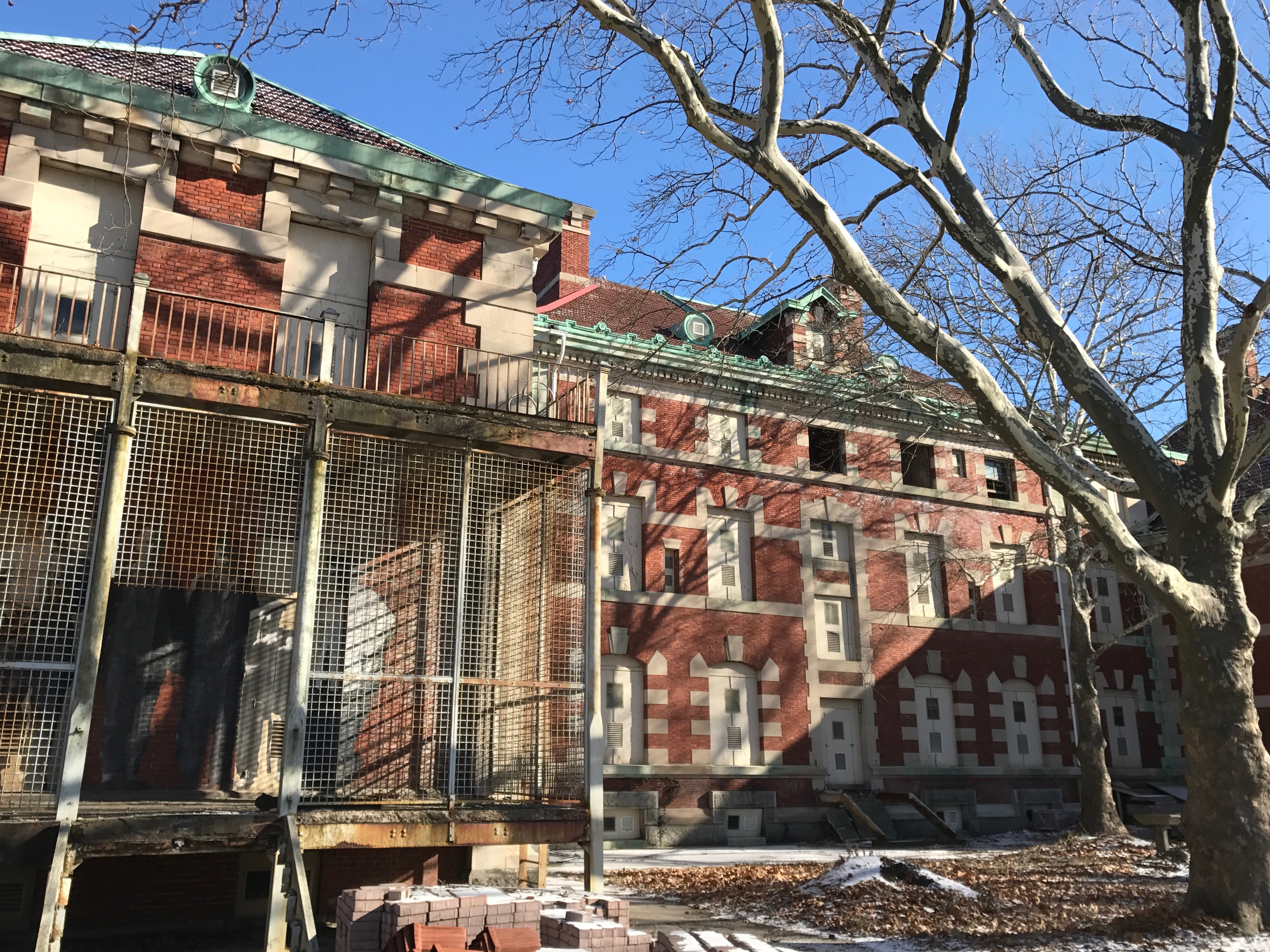
A south-facing porch of the psychopathic ward with the cage

The main building of the general hospital originally consisted of 125 beds and was eventually expanded to 300. Original concepts for the hospital included a rooftop bistro-style sitting and recreational area. With the Administration Building and Hospital Extension, the general hospital comprised four operating rooms, a women's ward, a pediatric ward, a maternity ward, and a psychiatric ward. It was equipped with two birdcage elevators. Wards were open, and had lots of windows for ventilation and natural light. Each ward was also provided with a south-facing porch for fresh air, and activity. The operating rooms were located on the third floor and had skylights in order to provide the best lighting possible. Supplemental lighting was provided via I.P. Frink.

The structures on Island 2 shared the same design as the original facilities on island 1: a brick facade in Flemish bond, quoins, and limestone ornamentation. All structures were internally connected via covered passageways.

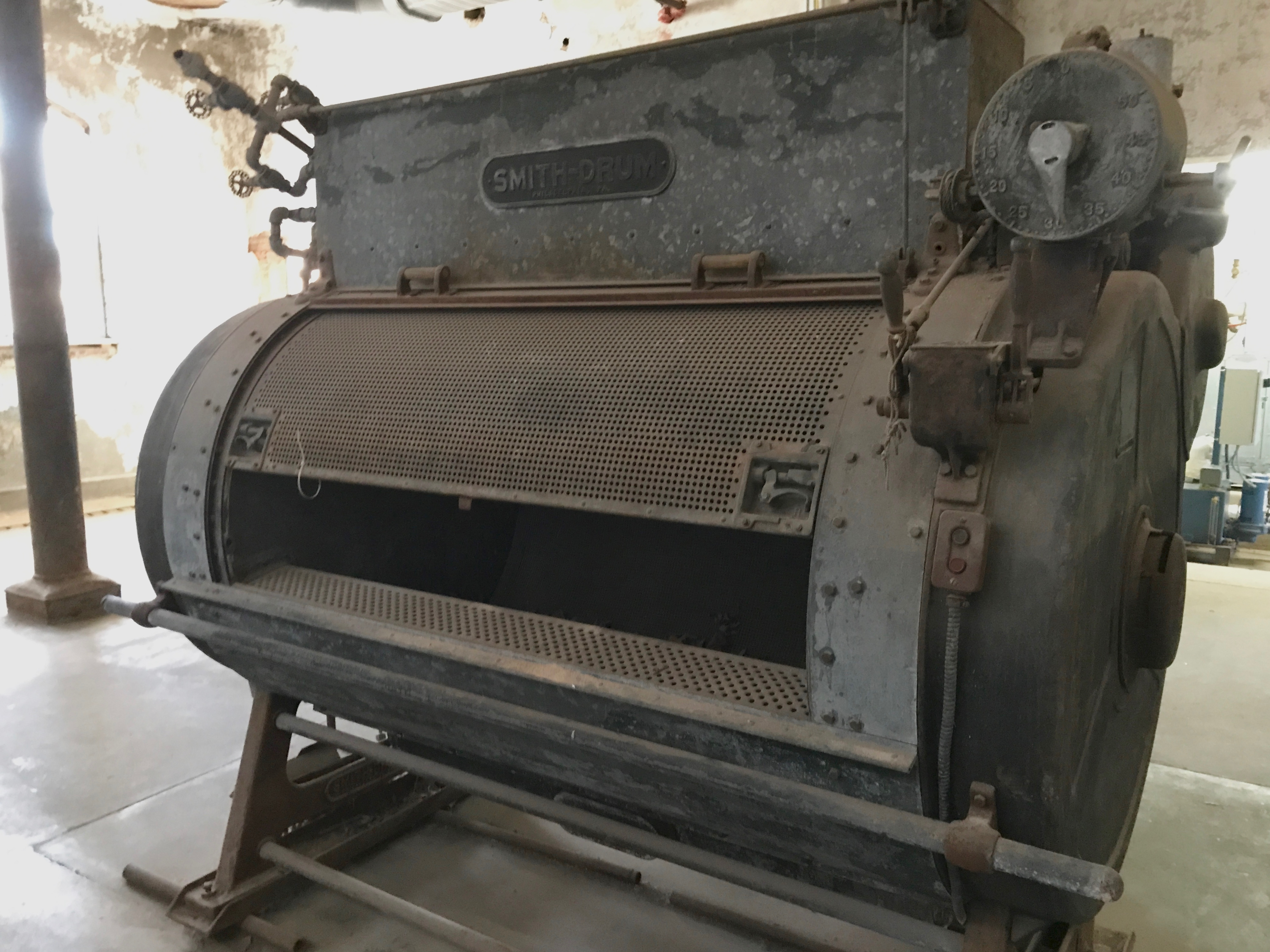
A Smith Drum machine in the outbuilding

Along the central corridor connecting the islands, (on Island 2, just south of the ferry terminal) is the Laundry Building, which was constructed in 1900–1901 along with the now-demolished surgeon's house. The structure is one and a half stories tall with a hip roof and skylights facing to the north and south. Repaired repeatedly throughout its history, the laundry-outbuilding was last restored in 2002. It had linen, laundry, and disinfecting rooms; a boiler room; a morgue with autopsy room; and quarters for the laundry staff on the second floor.

To the east of the Laundry Building, on island 2 is the psychopathic ward, a two-story building erected in 1906–1907. This building is the only structure in the hospital complex to have a flat roof, and it previously also had a porch to its south. It housed 25 to 30 beds and was intended for the temporary treatment of immigrants suspected of being insane or having mental disorders, pending their deportation, hospitalization, or commitment to sanatoria. Male and female patients were segregated, and there were also a dayroom, veranda, nurse's office, and small pantry on each floor. In 1952 the psychopathic ward was converted into a Coast Guard brig.

The main General Hospital building is directly east of the psychopathic ward. It is composed of three similarly designed structures: from west to east, they are Hospital Building No. 1 (built 1900–1901), the Administration Building (1905–1907), and Hospital Building No. 2 (1908–1909). The 3.5-story building no. 1 is shaped like an inverted "C" with two 2.5-story rectangular wings facing southward; the wings contain two-story-tall porches. The administration building is smaller but also 3.5 stories. The 3.5-story building no. 2 is similar to building no. 1, but also has a three-story porch at the south elevation of the central pavilion. All three buildings have stone-stoop entrances on their north facades and courtyards on their south.

=== Contagious disease hospital ===
On Island 3, the contagious disease hospital comprised eight separate two-story pavilions, an administration building, and a kitchen all connected by a center and three completely separated isolation pavilions extending along the same corridor axis. The 16 measles wards, (also known as ward A-H) were built in phases from 1906 to 1909. In sequence, the two-story pavilions were arranged with four pavilions each to the west and east of island 3's administration building and the kitchen building. Wards A, B, E and F were located south of the connection corridor; wards C, D, G, H, to the north of corridor. Each of these pavilions held all the necessary service spaces to function independently, and each ward could be sealed off in order to prevent cross-contamination, the principal cause of death prior to the invention of antibiotics . Most of the structures were completed in 1911. The three isolation wards were located along the axis of the corridor but beyond the limits of its enclosure. Each contained two separate wards. The power house/sterilizer/autopsy theater, mortuary, laboratory/pharmacy building were located at the southwest end of the connecting corridor and the Staff House at the Northeast end. The kitchen building and Administrative building, which also was dormitory for the nurses, were located in the center of the corridor. All structures were designed by James Knox Taylor in the Italian Renaissance style and are distinguished by red-tiled hip roofs, exposed rafter tails, roughcast or pebble dashed walls of stucco, and ornamentation of brick and limestone.

Several design features of the hospital were specifically intended to help contain the diseases. The laundry facility was equipped with a large steam-heated autoclave to sanitize mattresses. In Tuberculosis Wards, each patient room had two sinks. The higher sink was used for spitting and the lower sink was for washing. The autopsy amphitheater which contained an eight-cadaver refrigerator, became a well-known teaching hall, drawing medical observers from teaching hospitals in the United States and Europe. Eventually, the hospital boasted 22 wards, including separate wards for men, women, children, surgery patients, and the insane.

==== Structures ====
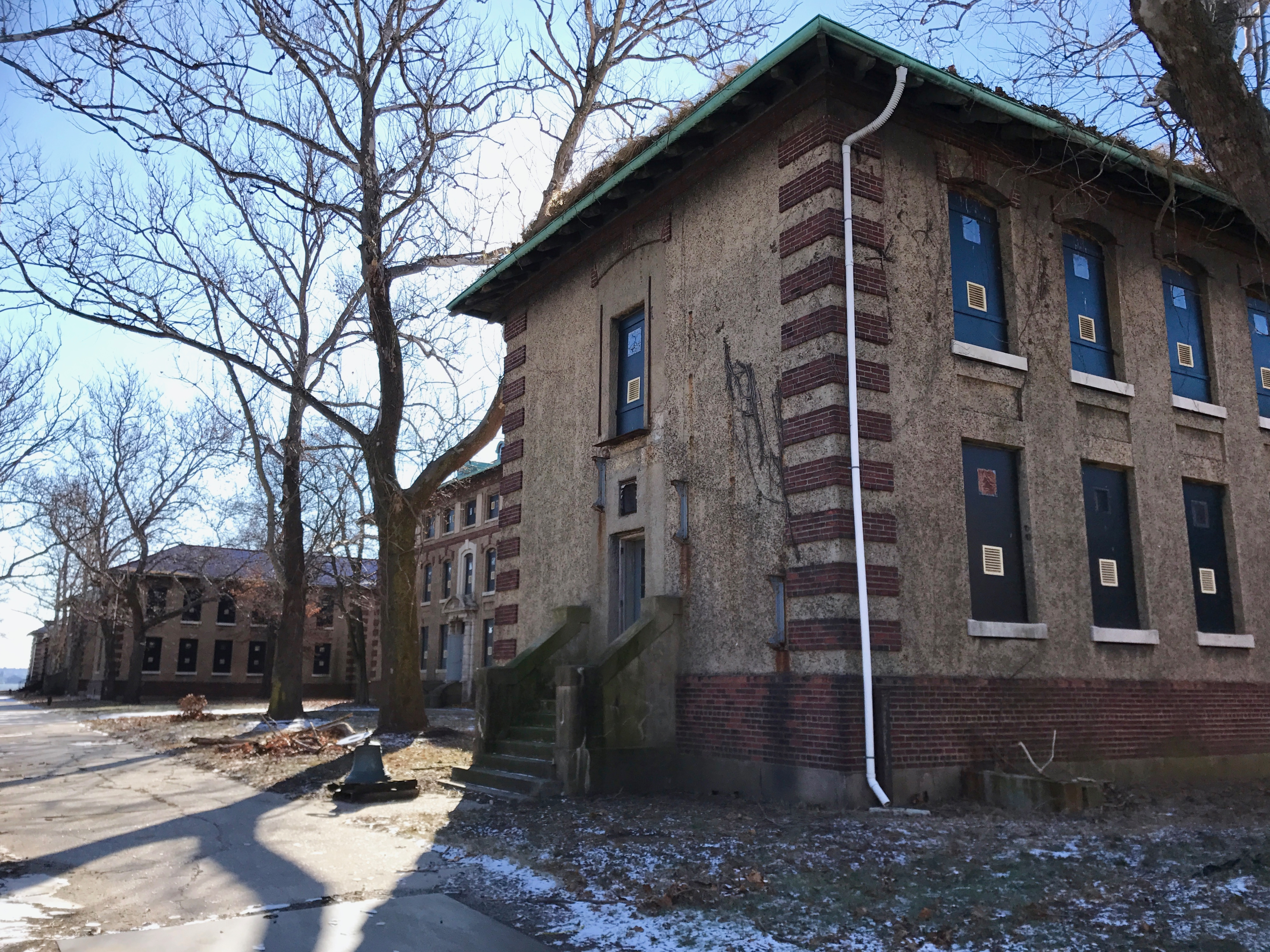
Exterior of the contagious disease hospital

The Office Building and Laboratory is a 2.5-story structure located at the west end of island 3. It housed doctors' offices and a dispensary on the first floor, along with a laboratory and pharmacists' quarters on the second floor. In 1924, the first floor offices were converted into male nurses' quarters. A one-story morgue is located east of the office building, and was converted to the "Animal House" circa 1919.

An L-shaped powerhouse and laundry building, built in 1908, is also located on the west side of island 3. It has a square north wing with boiler, coal, and pump rooms, as well as a rectangular south wing with laundry and disinfection rooms, staff kitchen, and staff pantry. The powerhouse and laundry also had a distinctive yellow-brick smokestack. Part of the building was converted into a morgue and autopsy room in the 1930s.

To the east are the eight measles pavilions. All of the pavilions are identical, two-story rectangular structures. Each pavilion held a spacious open ward with large windows on three sides and independent ventilation ducts. A hall leading to the connecting corridor was flanked by bathrooms, nurses' duty room, offices, and a serving kitchen.

The administration building for the Contagious Disease Hospital is a 3.5-story structure located on the north side of island 3's connecting corridor, in the center of the landmass. It included reception rooms, offices, and a staff kitchen on the first floor; nurses' quarters and operating rooms on the second floor; and additional staff quarters on the third floor. A one-story kitchen with a smokestack is located opposite the administration building to the south.

At the extreme eastern end of island three were three separate isolation pavilions, which contained (wards I-L) and a staff house. These pavilions were intended for patients with more serious infectious diseases, including scarlet fever, diphtheria, and a combination of either of these diseases with measles and whooping cough. Each pavilion was a 1.5-story rectangular structure. Wards I and K are located to the south of the connecting corridor while ward L is located to the north; originally, all three pavilions were freestanding structures, but covered ways were built between wards I and K and the center corridor in 1914. There were also nurses' quarters in each attic. The staff building. located at the extreme east end of island 3's connecting corridor, is a 2.5-story building for high-ranking hospital staff. Living and dining rooms, a kitchen, and a library were located on the first floor while bedrooms were located on the second floor.

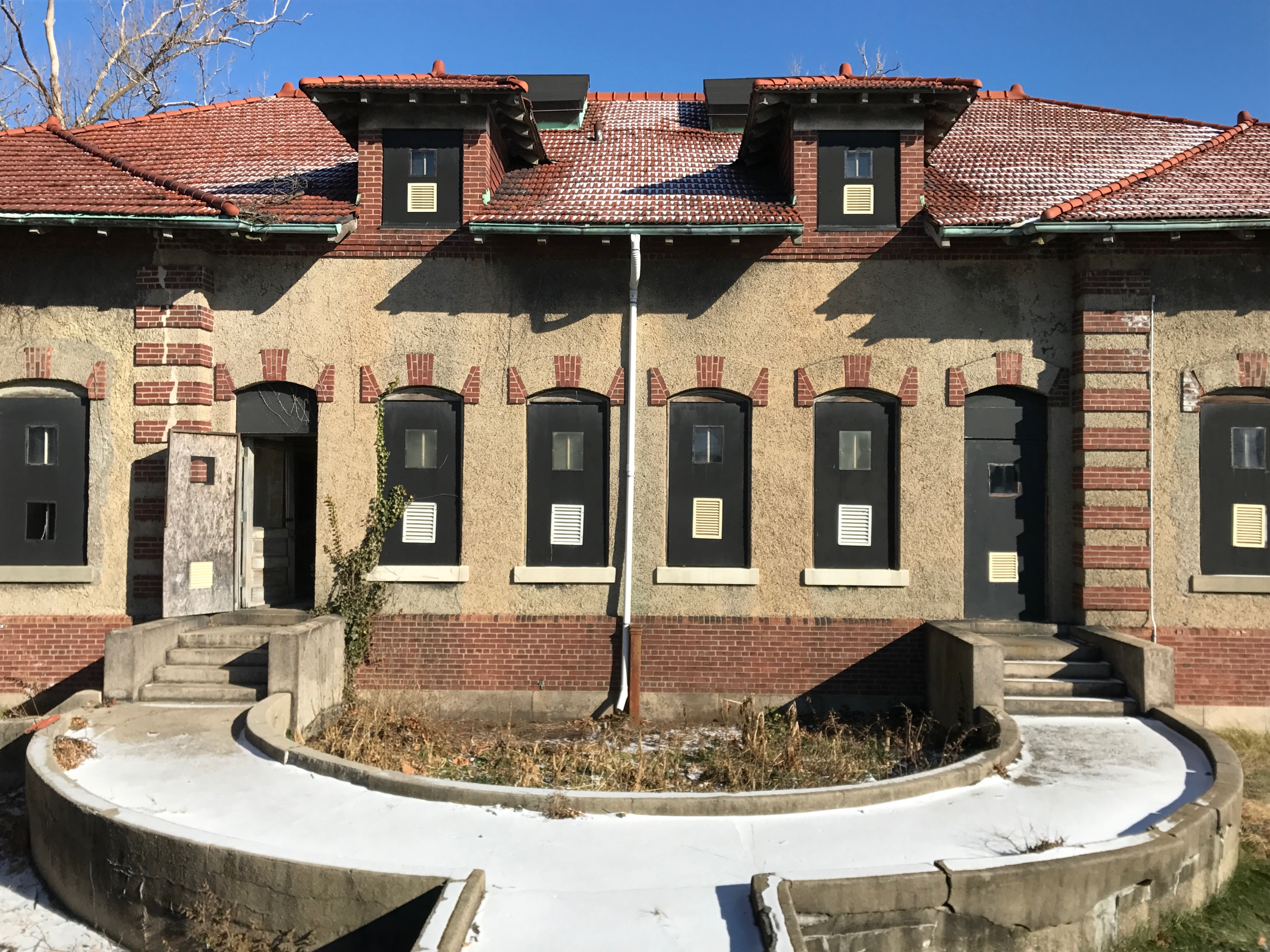
An isolation ward

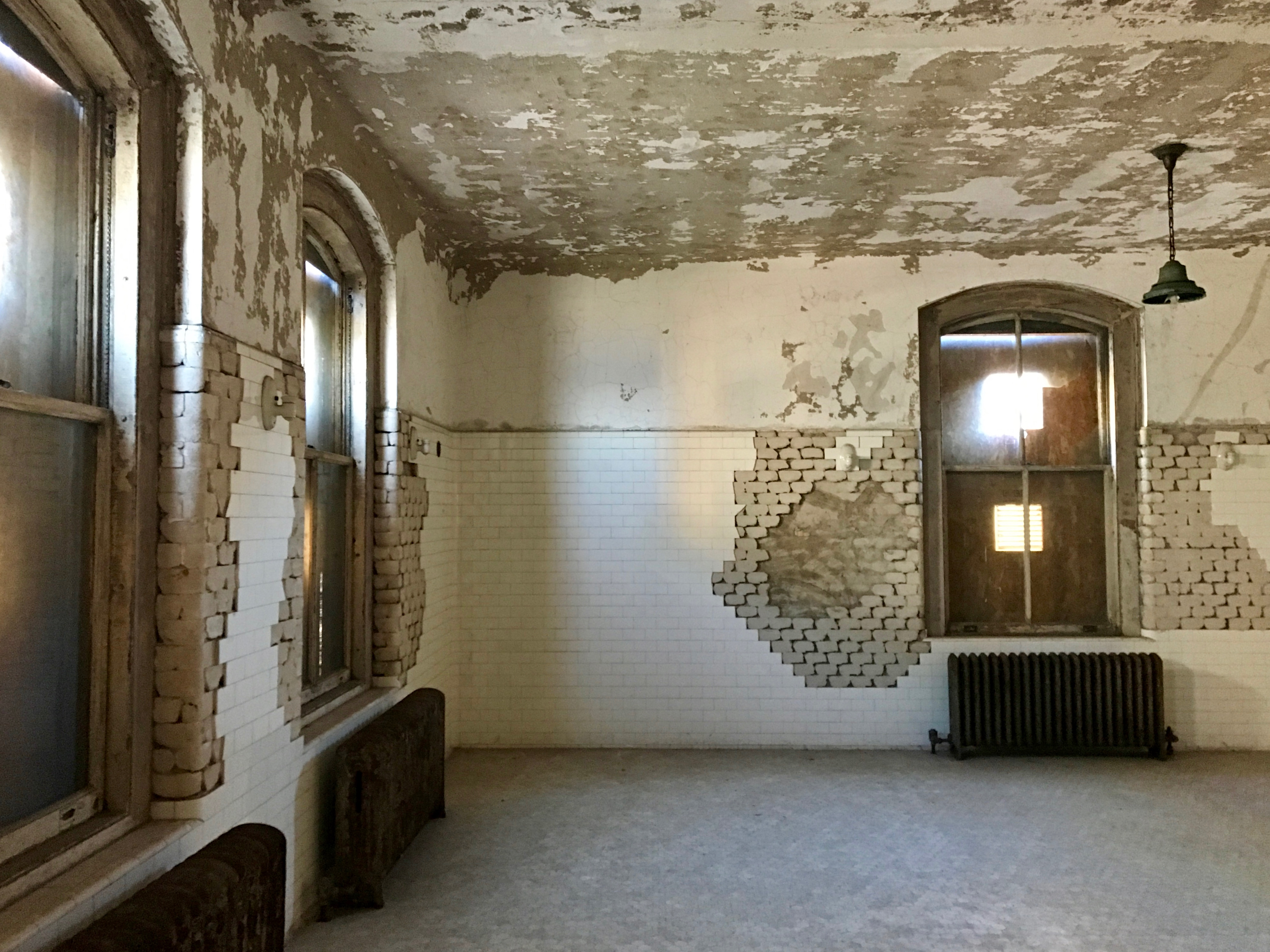
An operating room with white tile walls

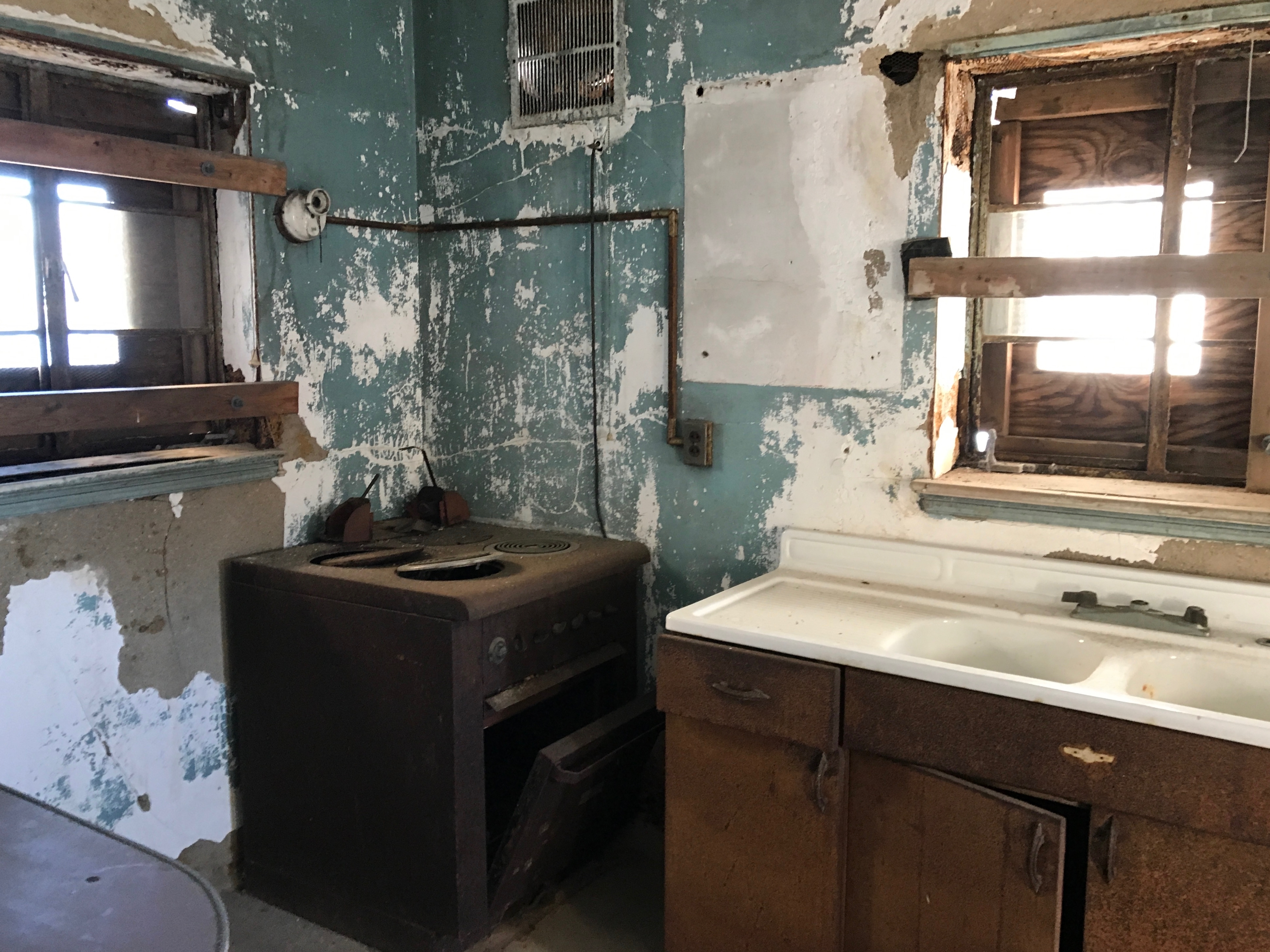
The kitchen inside the staff house

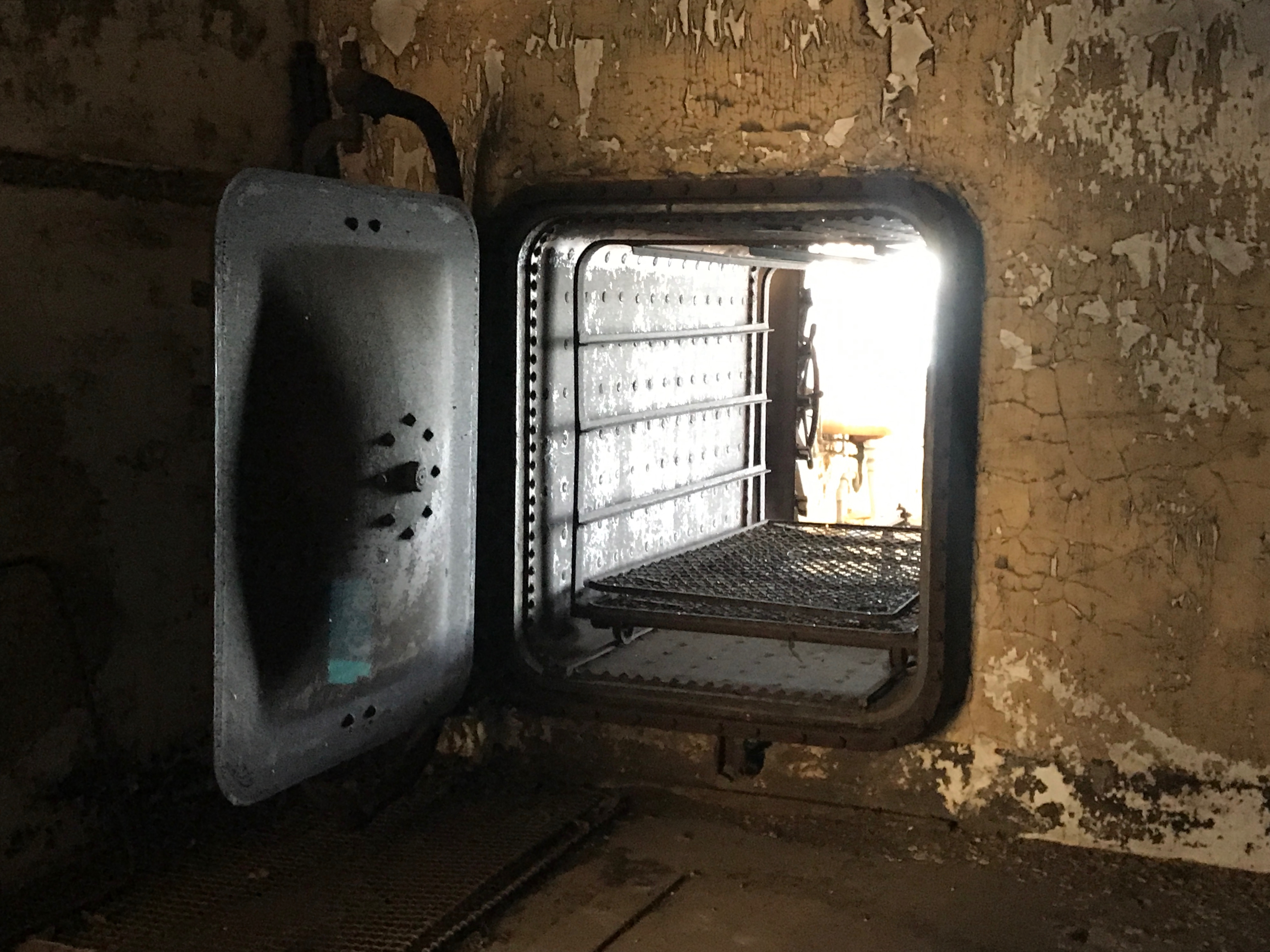
A large autoclave to sanitize mattresses

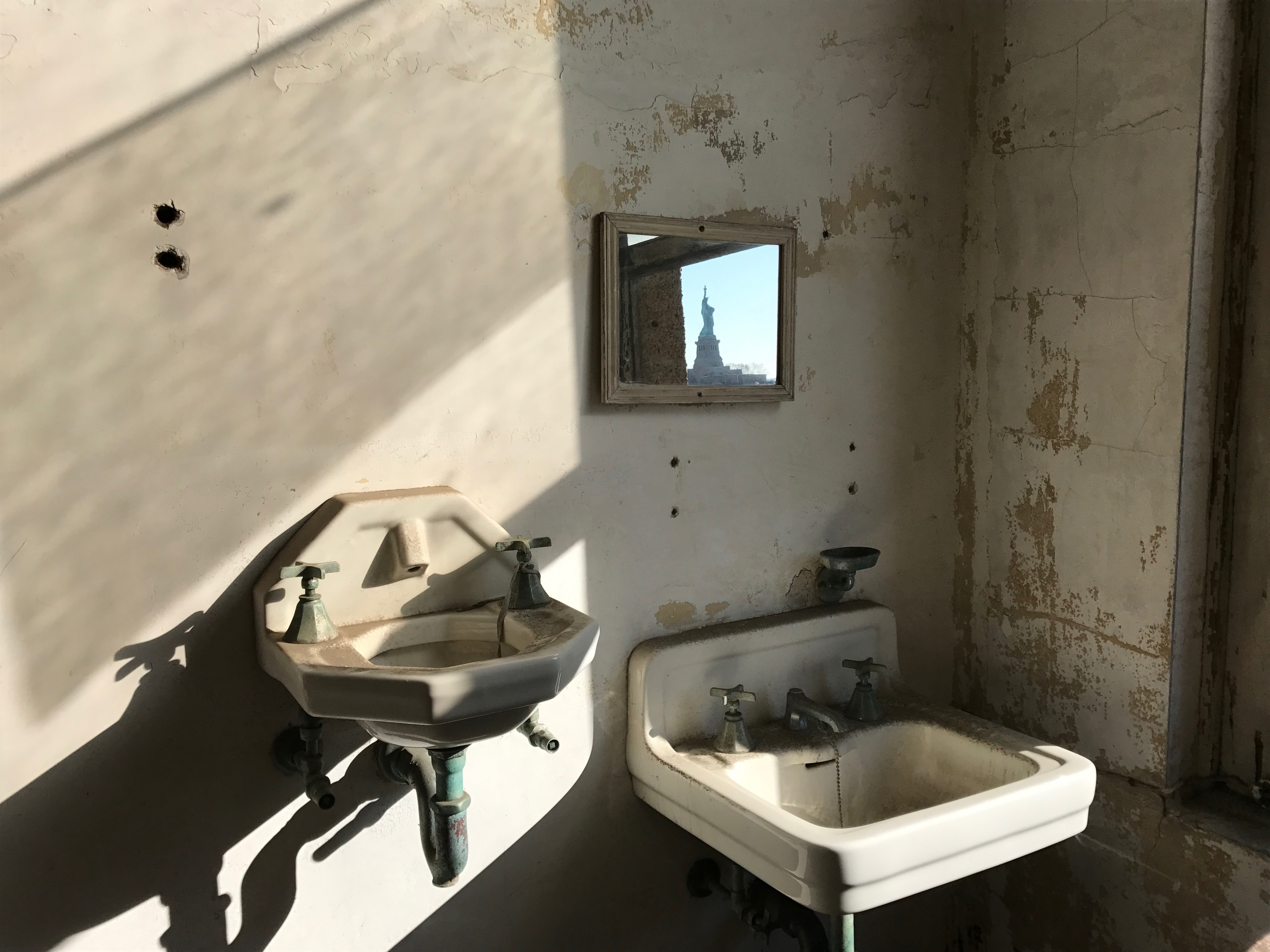
Two sinks in a Tuberculosis ward with the Statue of Liberty reflected in the mirror

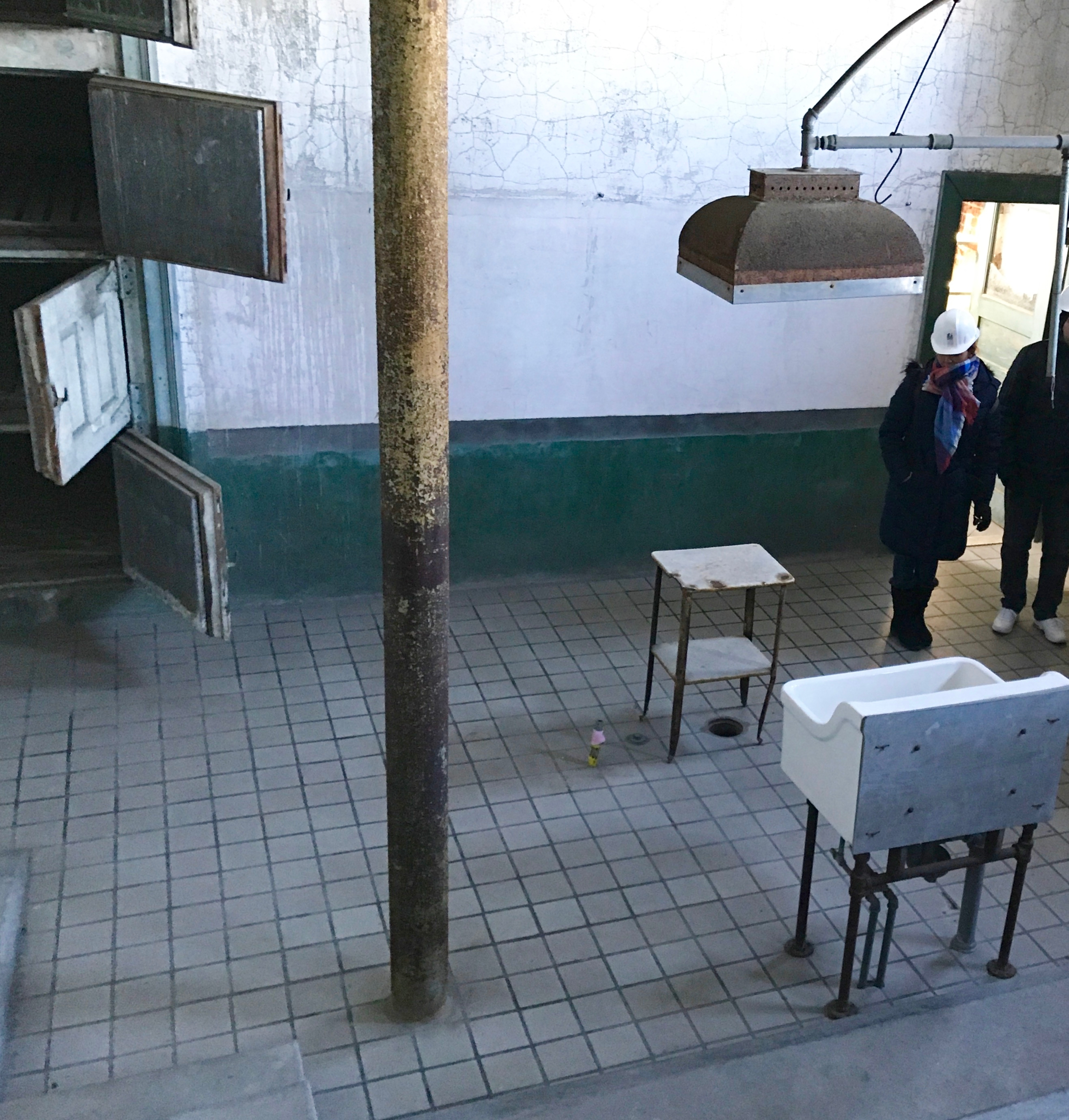
The autopsy amphitheater

== Public access ==
From 1955 to 2014 the hospital was not accessible to the general public. In 2014, the hospital opened to the public for guided 90-minute "Hard-Hat Tours". The Hard-Hat Tour ticket requires an additional fee on top of the regular ferry ticket. The additional fee revenues help fund the preservation of the south side. However, all tourists are required to stay with their tour groups and wear hard hats, and videos of the site are prohibited without prior approval.

== In media ==
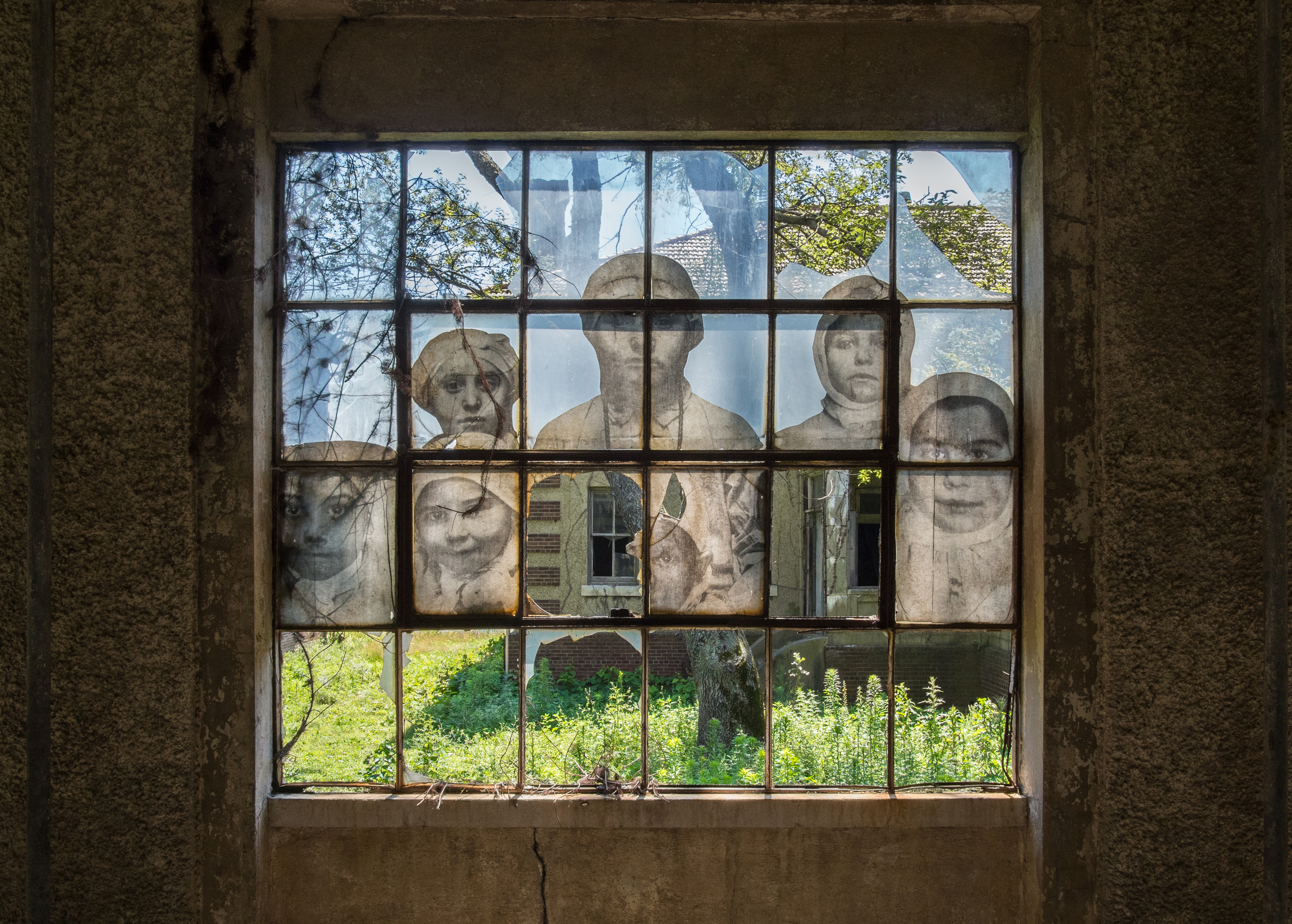
A mural from "Unframed – Ellis Island

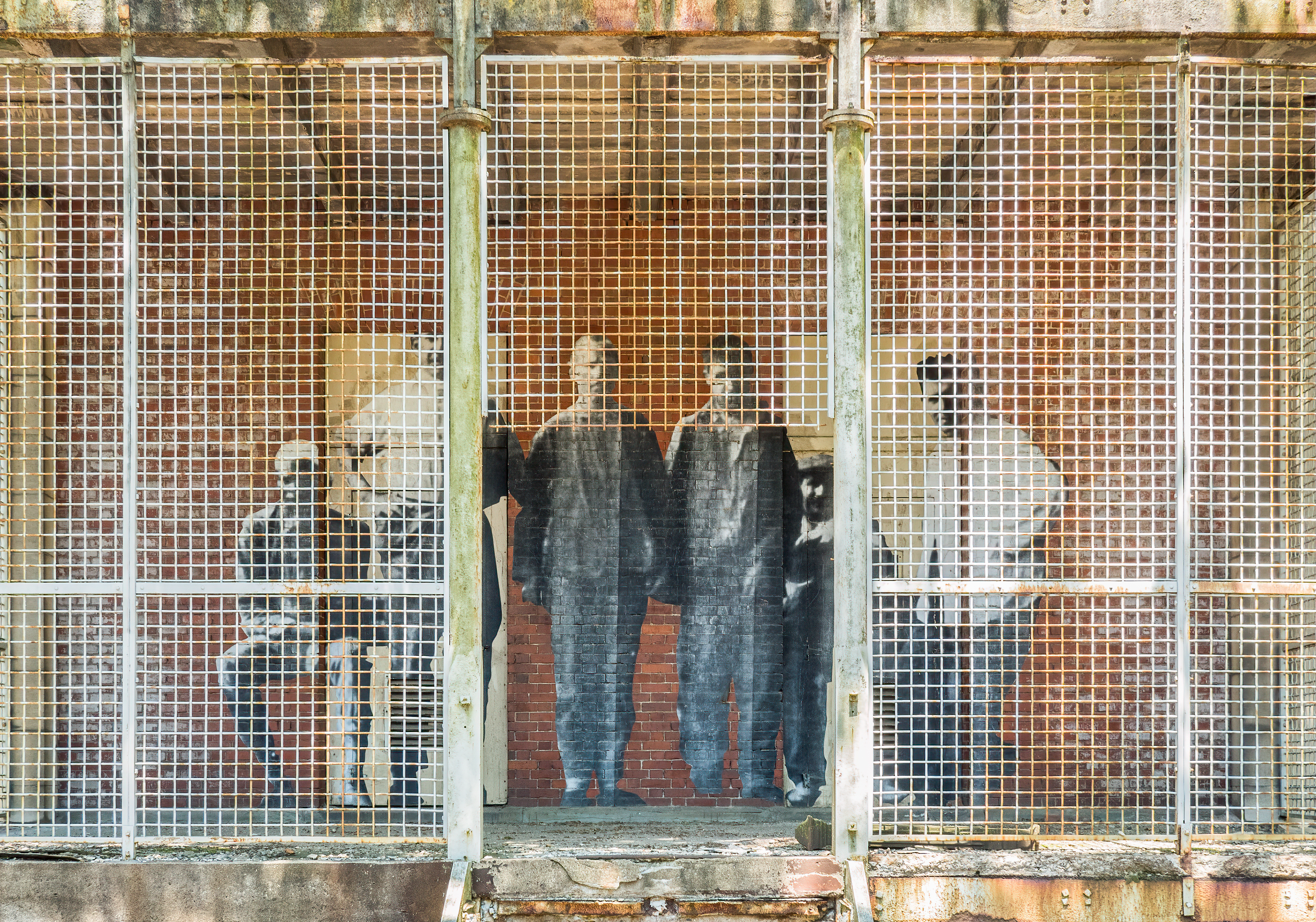
2014 work by JR at Ellis Island

In 2014, "Unframed – Ellis Island", an art installation by the French street artist JR, was installed. The work can be seen as part of the Hard-Hat Tour and includes murals of figures who would have occupied each of the respective hospital buildings.

Forgotten Ellis Island, a documentary by Lorie Conway, explores the abandoned buildings on the island and covers the history of the hospital. Conway also tracked down immigrants and descendants of immigrants who had spent time in the hospital and discussed their experiences with them. The film premiered on Ellis Island and was later shown on CBS in 2007.

On October 29, 2019, The Today Show aired a piece on the Immigrant Hospitals titled "Al Roker gets a tour of the abandoned Ellis Island hospitals."

== See also ==
- Hoffman Island
- Jersey City Reservoir No. 3
- Ellis, 2015 film
