= Forgotten Ellis Island =

- Directed by: Lorie Conway
- Produced by: Amy Stechler
- Narrated by: Elliott Gould
- Cinematography: Ken Willinger
- Edited by: William A. Anderson
- Music by: Gil Talmi
- Release date: June 8, 2008 (Boston Film Festival)
- Running time: 62 minutes
- Country: United States
- Language: English

Forgotten Ellis Island is a documentary film directed by Lorie Conway and narrated by Elliott Gould. A book of the same name by Lorie Conway, designed by Judith Stagnitto Abbate, was published by Smithsonian Books in 2007. The film took 9 years to produce and was supported by three grants from the National Endowment for the Humanities. It portrays the story of the Ellis Island Immigrant Hospital. The work premiered on the Public Broadcasting Service on February 9, 2009.
