= Save Ellis Island =

Organization

- Founded: 1999; 27 years ago
- Tax ID no.: 22-3659296
- Legal status: 501(c)(3)
- Headquarters: 31 US Highway 206, Suite 3E, Augusta, New Jersey, U.S.
- Chair, Board of Directors: Catherine Burke
- President, Chief Executive Officer: Janis Calella
- Revenue: $1,145,038 (2017)
- Expenses: $696,975 (2017)
- Employees: 10 (2016)
- Volunteers: 35 (2016)
- Website: www.saveellisisland.org

Save Ellis Island, founded in 1999, is a 501(c)(3) organization and partner of the National Park Service for the rehabilitation of the 29 mostly unrestored buildings comprising the Ellis Island Immigrant Hospital on the south side of Ellis Island in New York Harbor.

== Context ==
Ellis Island is part of the Statue of Liberty National Monument. It was one of the primary immigration centers used in America starting at its opening in 1892. More than 12 million immigrants passed through Ellis Island between 1892 and 1954, reaching a peak of 1.25 million in 1907. Some came from everywhere to escape religious and political persecution and war. But most just wanted a better life and the "American Dream".

The Ellis Island Hospital was a 750-bed facility which treated over 1.2 million patients, 250,000 immigrants were treated for illnesses such as tuberculosis, measles, diphtheria, trachoma and other contagious diseases. Over 350 babies were born there. It has been estimated that one third of Americans today can trace at least one ancestor's entry into the United States through Ellis Island.

In 2001, Save Ellis Island entered into an agreement with the National Park Service to coordinate fundraising activities and oversee the historic preservation of Ellis Island.

== Reopening of unrestored Ellis Island buildings ==
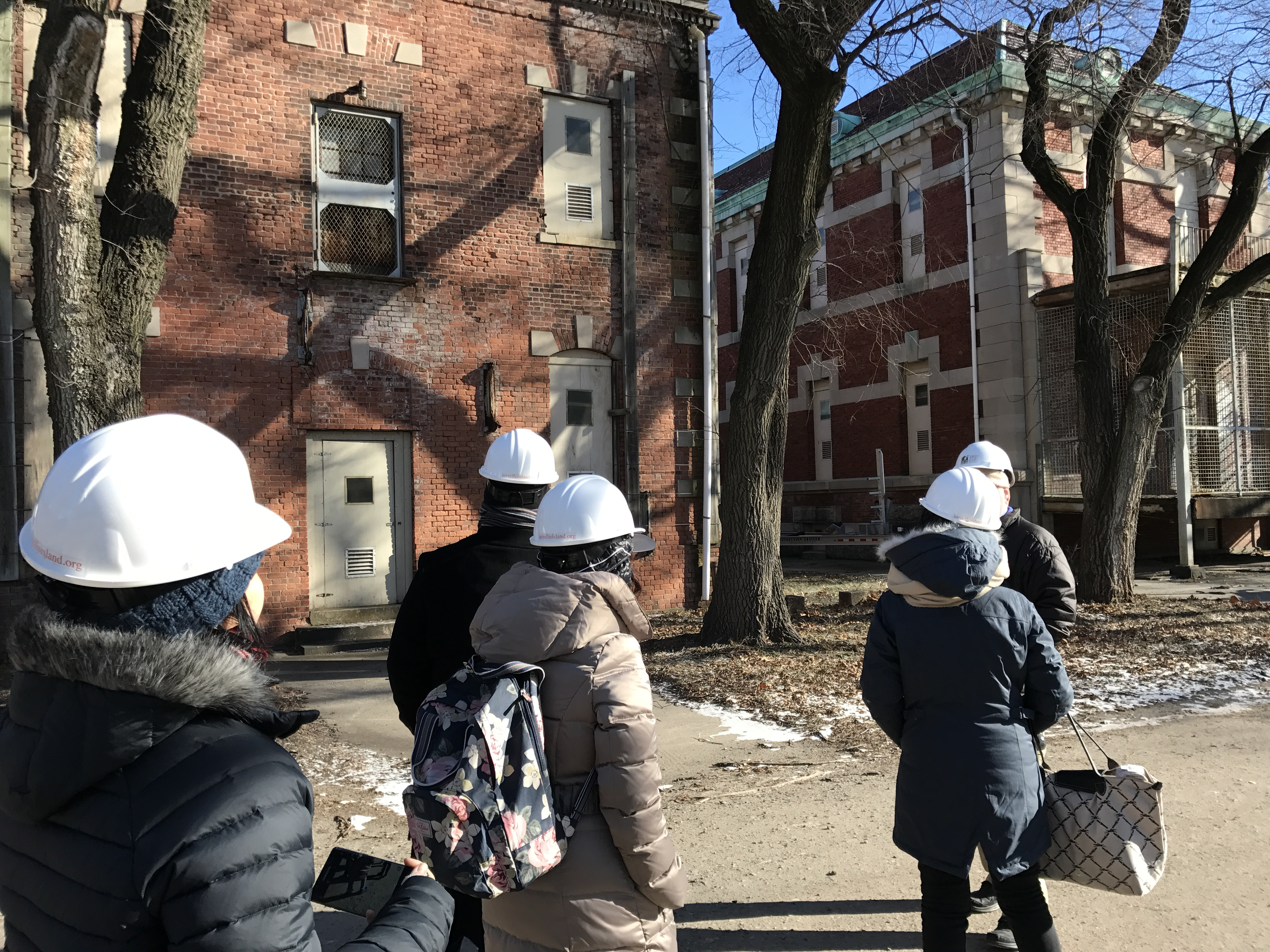
A public tour of the south side

Shuttered for 60 years, Ellis Island's South Side Hospital Complex was opened to visitors for the first time on October 1, 2014, revealing an overlooked story in immigration to the United States. Approximately one immigrant out of ten who arrived at Ellis Island received medical attention at this facility.

In its day, the 29-building complex was the largest U.S. Public Health Service Institution in the United States. Ill and infirm immigrants were treated and cured within its walls before being allowed to enter the country. Approximately 1.2 million of the 12 million immigrants who passed through Ellis Island received medical treatment at what may have been the most modern, comprehensive hospital in the nation. This facility included wards for obstetrics, mental health and contagious diseases. It had laundry facilities and even a morgue.

Save Ellis Island, in partnership with the National Park Service (NPS), raised funds to stabilize and partially restore several of the hospital complex buildings.

== First building ==
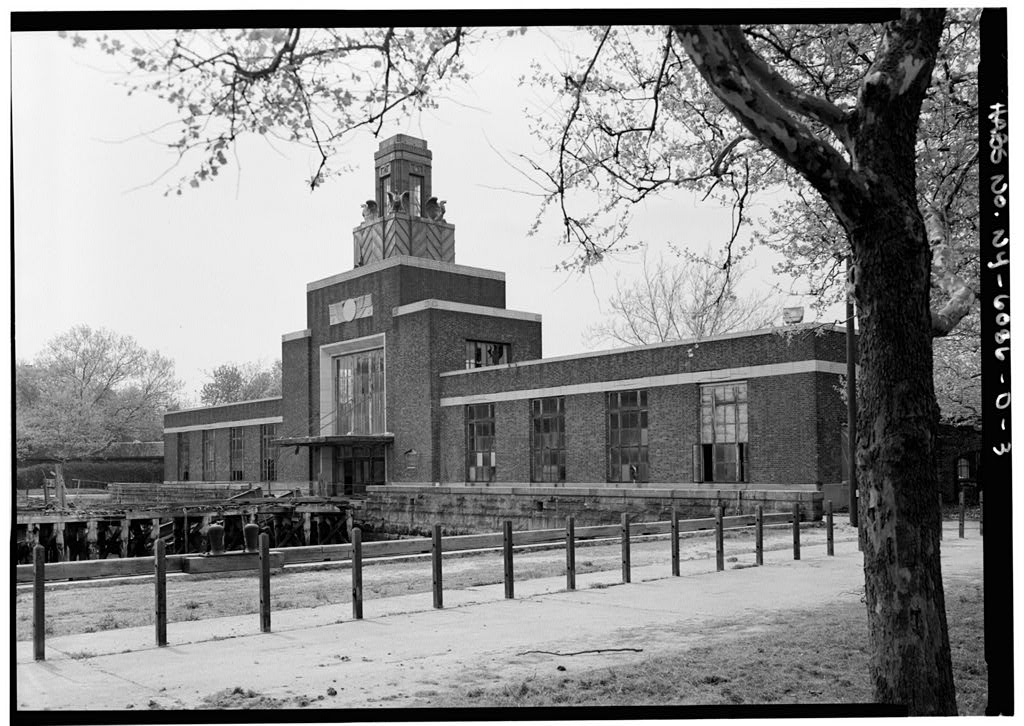
New Ferry Building before renovation

The south side of the island is dominated by the Ellis Island Immigrant Hospital, whose restoration began in 2000. Exterior work and the interior restoration began in 2006 and cost $6.4 million.

On April 2, 2007, Save Ellis Island and the National Park Service completed their first project of restoring the Ellis Island Ferry Building in the center of the island.
