= Ellis (film) =

- Teaser poster
- Directed by: JR
- Written by: Eric Roth
- Produced by: JR; Jane Rosenthal
- Starring: Robert De Niro
- Cinematography: André Chemetoff
- Edited by: Maxime Pozzi-Garcia
- Music by: Nils Frahm; Woodkid
- Distributed by: Unframed SA
- Release date: October 4, 2015 (The New Yorker Festival)
- Running time: 14 minutes
- Language: English

Ellis is a short film directed by JR and starring Robert De Niro. The motion picture awakens memories of the early years of the experience of one immigrant. The screenplay was written by Academy Award winner Eric Roth. The shooting took place in the abandoned Ellis Island Hospital complex. The film premiered on October 4, 2015 at The New Yorker Festival.

== Plot ==
The film tells the story of the forgotten times, immigrants who built America. The film shows an abandoned Ellis Island Hospital complex, where many memories of immigrants associated with this place.
