= Congregation Tifereth Israel (Queens) =

Historic synagogue in New York City

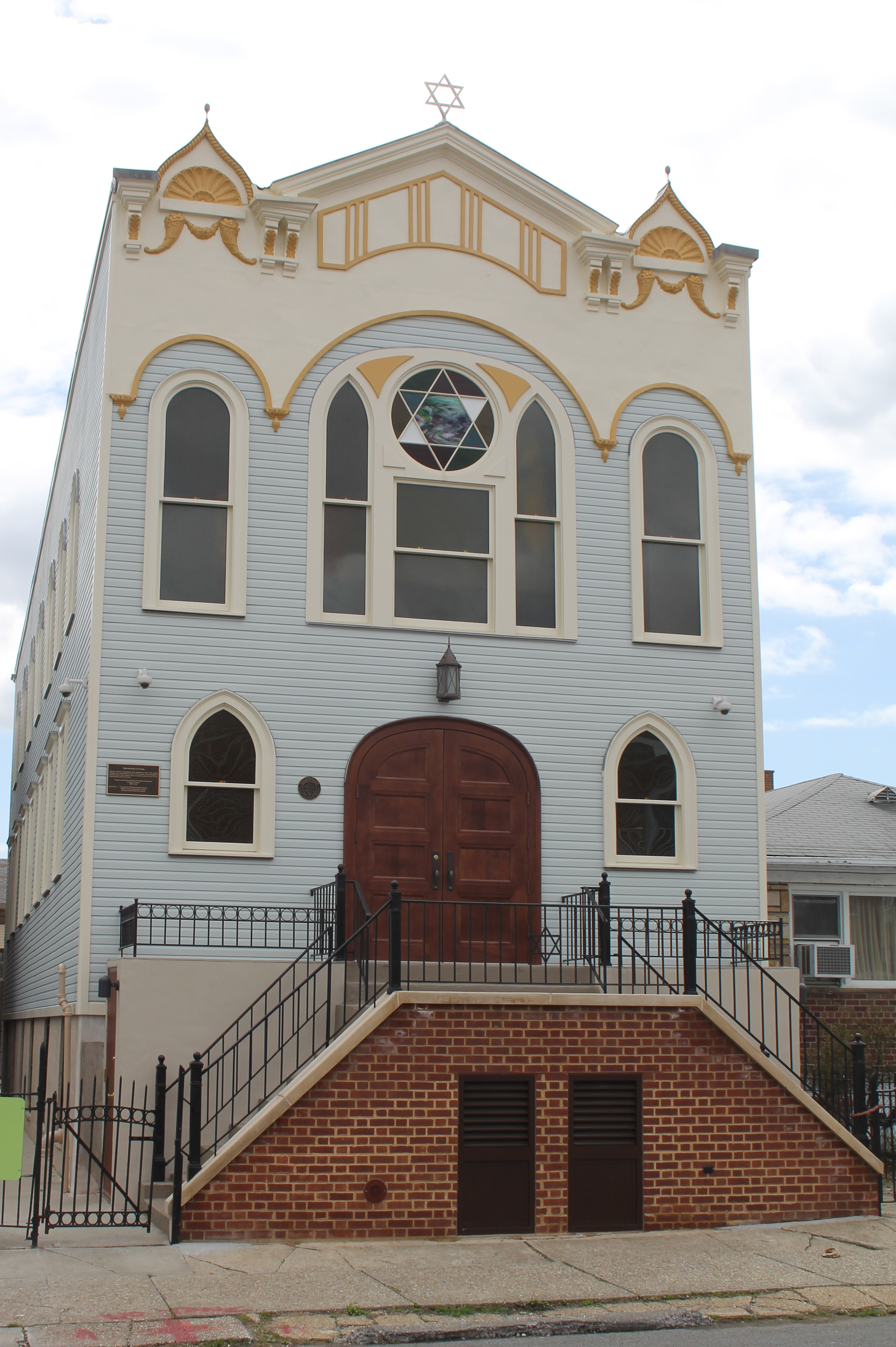
- Congregation Tifereth Israel synagogue, in 2013

- Location in New York City

Religion
- Affiliation: Orthodox Judaism
- Rite: Nusach Ashkenaz
- Ecclesiastical or organisational status: Synagogue
- Status: Active

Location
- Location: 109-18 and 109-20 54th Avenue, Corona, Queens, New York City, New York
- Country: United States
- Coordinates: 40°44′32″N 73°51′11″W

Architecture
- Architect: Crescent L. Varrone
- Type: Synagogue architecture
- Style: Gothic Revival; Moorish Revival
- Established: c. 1907 (as a congregation)
- Completed: 1911

Specifications
- Length: 100 feet (30 m)
- Width: 20 feet (6.1 m)
- Materials: Wood frame, clapboard siding, stucco
- Congregation Tifereth Israel
- U.S. National Register of Historic Places
- New York State Register of Historic Places
- New York City Landmark No. 2283
- NRHP reference No.: 02001357
- NYCL No.: 2283

Significant dates
- Added to NRHP: November 21, 2002
- Designated NYSRHP: 2002
- Designated NYCL: February 12, 2008

Congregation Tifereth Israel ("Splendor of Israel") is an Orthodox Jewish congregation and synagogue, located in the Corona section of Queens, in New York City, New York, in the United States. It was founded by Ashkenazi Jews who had moved to Queens from Manhattan's Lower East Side. Estée Lauder and her parents were early members.

The congregation constructed its synagogue building in 1911, a wooden Gothic Revival and Moorish Revival structure designed by Crescent L. Varrone, and modeled after the narrow tenement synagogues built on Manhattan's Lower East Side. The walls were later stuccoed. Neighborhood demographics changed, and most Jews moved away starting in the 1970s. By the 1990s, the remaining congregation was aged, and had difficulty paying for synagogue repairs and finding enough men for a prayer quorum.

Bukharan Jews began moving to Corona in the 1990s, and in the mid-1990s began worshiping in Tifereth Israel's basement. Disputes between the old congregation and the Bukharan Jews and their new rabbi came to a head in 1997. Lawsuits in rabbinical and state courts led to the Bukharan congregation taking over the synagogue. The building deteriorated, and by 2008 was in need of $1.4 million in exterior repairs alone.

As of 2010, the New York Landmarks Conservancy had begun $1.5 million in restoration work. Tifereth Israel's building was the oldest structure built as a synagogue in Queens, and the oldest synagogue building in Queens continuously used for worship.

== Early history ==
The congregation was founded in 1906 or 1907 as "Congregation Independent Chevra Tyfers Israel Anshei Corona" to accommodate Ashkenazi Jews who had moved to Queens from Manhattan's Lower East Side. It was known informally as the "Home Street Synagogue", after the original name of the street on which it is located.

At the time, most synagogues used the word "Anshei" (Hebrew for "people of") in their names to designate the city or region in Europe from which their members originated. Tifereth Israel, however, used the term "Anshei Corona" to indicate that it was their new neighborhood of Corona, Queens that united the synagogue members. The Articles of Incorporation stated that the congregation's intent was "[t]o have a synagogue for the purposes of praying, to bury their dead, and to advance its members spiritually and intellectually." When the synagogue was founded, approximately 20,000 of New York City's 1.5 million Jews lived in Queens, and Corona had two Jewish neighborhoods. Estée Lauder (née Josephine Esther Mentzer) and her parents were early members; her parents owned a hardware store two blocks from the synagogue.

In 1911, the congregation constructed a synagogue building on a 20-by-100-foot (6.1 m × 30.5 m) lot at the corner of 54th Avenue. It was modeled after the synagogues built on Manhattan's Lower East Side, which had to be squeezed into narrow tenement lots. The two-story building, designed by Crescent L. Varrone, was wood framed, and "combined Gothic and Moorish design with Judaic ornament: pointed-arched windows, a roundel with a Star of David in colored glass, and a gabled parapet". The stoop, railing and clapboard siding were originally wood; the porch was later redone in brick with an iron railing, and the siding was covered with stucco. The facade was tripartite, consisting of a large central entrance-way and two smaller flanking towers. The basement was used for classes, including Hebrew lessons for Bar Mitzvah boys. A later addition on the same lot was a mikveh (ritual bath). The porch was later redone in brick with an iron railing, and the siding was covered with stucco. The latter, however, created problems; the stucco retained moisture, damaging the underlying wood.

== Yeshiva ==
At one time the congregation opened an associated yeshiva on 53rd Avenue. It closed in the 1970s, and was converted into a music studio and residence. The American entertainer Madonna lived there in 1979 and 1980.

== Changing demographics ==
Corona's Orthodox community once had four synagogues. The demographics of the neighborhood changed over the decades, with successive immigrant waves first of Italians in the 1930s and 40s, then Hispanics, then blacks. Most Jews moved to Long Island in the 1970s. While Tifereth Israel still had a large membership in the 1960s, it subsequently dwindled, and by the 1990s the synagogue building had deteriorated and was mostly unused. Along with a bakery, it was one of two original Jewish institutions left in Corona. By 1997, the congregation had little money, and difficulty both paying for necessary repairs, and getting the ten men required for a minyan.

Bukharan Jews started moving to Corona in the 1990s. Five Bukharan Jewish families moved to LeFrak City in 1991; this number had grown to over 500 by 1995, and nearby apartment buildings held hundreds more. Bukharan Jews began worshiping at Tifereth Israel in the mid-1990s, holding their own services in the synagogue basement. Despite the fact that Tifereth Israel was an Ashkenazi synagogue, and the Bukharan Jews followed Sephardic law and customs, the groups initially co-existed peacefully. Conflict arose, however, in the spring of 1997, after Amnun Khaimov arrived as the Bukharans' rabbi. According to then-synagogue-president, 82-year-old Benjamin Fried, "They came and wanted to take the place over". Tifereth Israel's members wanted the Bukharans to help pay for the synagogue's upkeep, but Khaimov said that Bukharans were poor and could not afford to do so. Irwin Goldstein, who in 1997 had been Tifereth Israel's cantor for eight years, felt that "the rabbi's overwhelming presence, and followers, threaten[ed] to drown what remain[ed] of the Ashkenazic tradition at the synagogue". They believed that the Bukharans were hoping to start praying in the main sanctuary, relegating Tifereth Israel's members to the basement. Questions were also raised about Khaimov himself; all agreed he was qualified as a ritual slaughterer, but some doubted his rabbinic credentials. Yitzchak Yehoshua, the Chief Rabbi of the Bukharan Rabbinical Council of America, stated "I think he is a good butcher maybe, but he is no rabbi".

Fried began giving them access to the synagogue only on Shabbat and the Jewish holidays, and locking them out otherwise. In response, Violet Milne, a synagogue member and Holocaust survivor, filed lawsuits in the Greater Queens Rabbinical Court and the State Supreme Court on behalf of the Bukharans. The Rabbinical Court ruled that the synagogue had to remain open to all worshipers, and any available money must be used for repairs; on September 24, the State Supreme Court upheld that ruling. Khaimov and his congregation took over the synagogue.

== Building deterioration and renovation ==
The Sacred Sites program of the New York Landmarks Conservancy began working with the synagogue in 1999. It granted Tifereth Israel $4,700 to conduct an exterior and interior survey, and $10,000 in 2002 for exterior repairs. Though its appearance had changed considerably since it was constructed in 1911, according to Sacred Sites director Ann Friedman, the building was "a time capsule that is beautifully intact and in an unexpected place where there is new construction and housing all around". She stated that the Conservancy has also "paired the synagogue with a hotel developer who had been instrumental in restoring several upper West Side synagogues, and he just sent them $5,000 for their roof." The Queens Historical Society labeled it a "Queensmark" in 1999, and the synagogue building and rabbi's residence were added to the National Register of Historic Places on November 21, 2002, the first synagogue in Queens to be listed.

The New York City Landmarks Preservation Commission designated it as a city landmark in February 2008. One of two synagogues left in Corona, its interior was "substantially intact", and a number of its "distinctive architectural features" remained, "including its original windows, decorative wood ornament, and Moorish pressed metal details". By this time, however, the building had further deteriorated; it had termites, it leaked, the paint was peeling, and in January 2008 the basement ceiling collapsed. Friedman estimated exterior repairs alone would cost $1.4 million. The congregation had been allocated over $1 million by both New York City and New York State, including $700,000 capital funding from the Borough President's Office, and a $200,000 matching State grant. Legal issues impeded its ability to collect them, because it was a privately owned, religious non-profit organization. At the time, the rabbi's wife estimated that the congregation had 50 member families.

In 2010, according to the Conservancy, it had provided the synagogue with "$30,000 in direct grants and an additional $100,000 in pass-through funding". Funding had also been secured from the "State Environmental Protection Fund, The New York Community Trust and the families of Ronald and Leonard Lauder". It described the building as a "rare survival" of New York's wooden, vernacular synagogue architecture, A $275,000 gift from philanthropist Arnold Goldstein enabled the commencement of $1.5 million in restoration work. The Conservancy stated the restoration would "remove the present stucco coating and restore the original wood clapboard siding, wood windows and doors, Moorish-style metal domes and finials, and historic paint colors to this important building, returning it to its appearance of a century ago". Tifereth Israel's building is the oldest structure built as a synagogue in Queens, and it is the oldest synagogue building in Queens continuously used for worship. In 2020, the New York Landmarks Conservancy awarded the synagogue a $10,000 Sacred Site Grant for weather proofing the facility.

== See also ==
- List of New York City Designated Landmarks in Queens
- National Register of Historic Places listings in Queens County, New York
- New York State Register of Historic Places
