= Statue of Liberty National Monument =

United States national monument

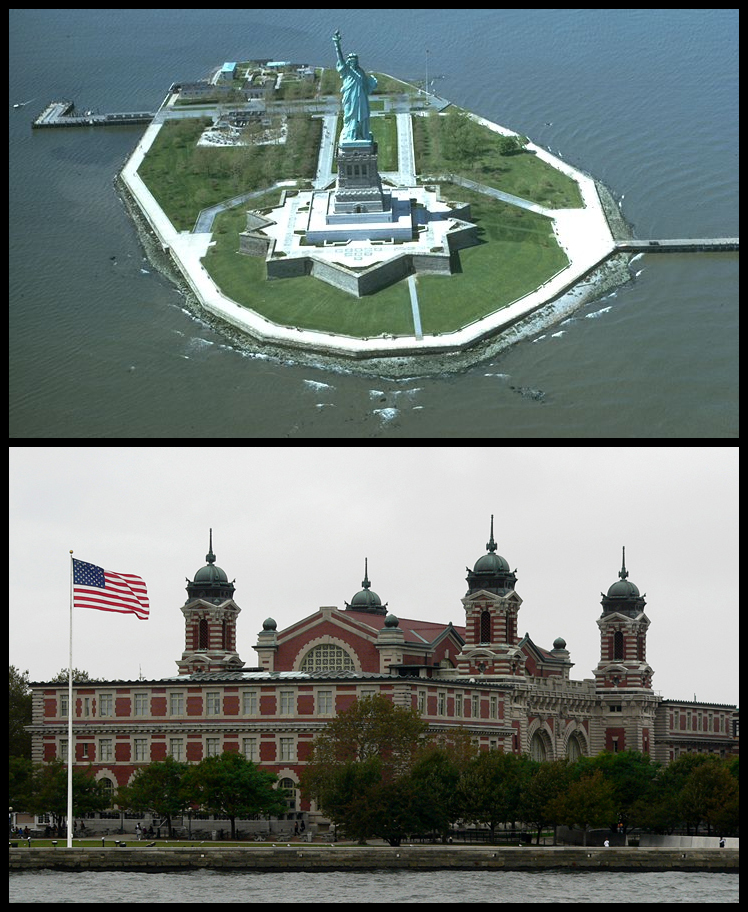

- Location in Port of New York and New Jersey Statue of Liberty National Monument (New York City) Statue of Liberty National Monument (New Jersey) Statue of Liberty National Monument (New York) Statue of Liberty National Monument (the United States)
- Interactive map of Statue of Liberty National Monument
- 40°41′39″N 74°2′35″W
- Location: New York City, New York and Jersey City, New Jersey

Site notes
- Area: 60.86 acres (0.2463 km^{2})
- Governing body: U.S. National Park Service
- Visitors: 3,538,231 (in 2025)
- Website: Statue of Liberty; Ellis Island

U.S. National Monument
- Designated: October 15, 1924; Statue of Liberty

U.S. National Monument
- Designated: May 11, 1965; Ellis Island

U.S. National Register of Historic Places
- Official name: Statue of Liberty National Monument, Ellis Island and Liberty Island
- Designated: October 15, 1966
- Reference no.: 66000058

New Jersey Register of Historic Places
- Official name: Statue of Liberty National Monument, Ellis Island and Liberty Island
- Designated: May 27, 1971
- Reference no.: 1535

The Statue of Liberty National Monument is a United States national monument comprising Liberty Island and Ellis Island in the states of New Jersey and New York. It includes the 1886 Statue of Liberty (Liberty Enlightening the World) by sculptor Frédéric Auguste Bartholdi and the Statue of Liberty Museum, both situated on Liberty Island, as well as the former immigration station at Ellis Island, which includes the Ellis Island Immigrant Hospital.

The monument is managed by the National Park Service as part of the National Parks of New York Harbor office.

== History ==
President Calvin Coolidge used his authority under the Antiquities Act to declare the statue a national monument in 1924. In 1937, by proclamation 2250, President Franklin D. Roosevelt expanded the monument to include all of Bedloe's Island, and in 1956, an act of Congress officially renamed it Liberty Island. Ellis Island was made part of the Statue of Liberty National Monument by proclamation of President Lyndon Johnson on May 11, 1965. The United States historic district, a single listing on the U.S. National Register of Historic Places, was designated in 1966.

The islands were closed during Hurricane Sandy in October 2012 and suffered severe damage. Liberty Island reopened July 4, 2013, while Ellis Island reopened October 24, 2013. Storm damage and the necessary repairs for them have heavily affected Ellis Island as hurricanes have become more common in the New York/New Jersey area.

On March 16, 2020, both islands closed due to the COVID-19 pandemic. On July 20, 2020, the Statue of Liberty reopened partially under New York City's Phase IV guidelines; Ellis Island reopened partially in August 2020.

== Significance ==
The Statue of Liberty is a world-famous symbol of freedom, given in 1886 by France to the United States in celebration of American Independence. Nearby Ellis Island was the first stop for millions of immigrants to the U.S. in the late 19th and early 20th centuries. The national monument recalls this period of massive immigration to the United States.

Inside the statue, a plaque added in 1903 is engraved with words from "The New Colossus", an 1883 poem by Emma Lazarus:

Give me your tired, your poor,

Your huddled masses yearning to breathe free,
The wretched refuse of your teeming shore.
Send these, the homeless, tempest-tossed to me,

I lift my lamp beside the golden door!

== Location and access ==
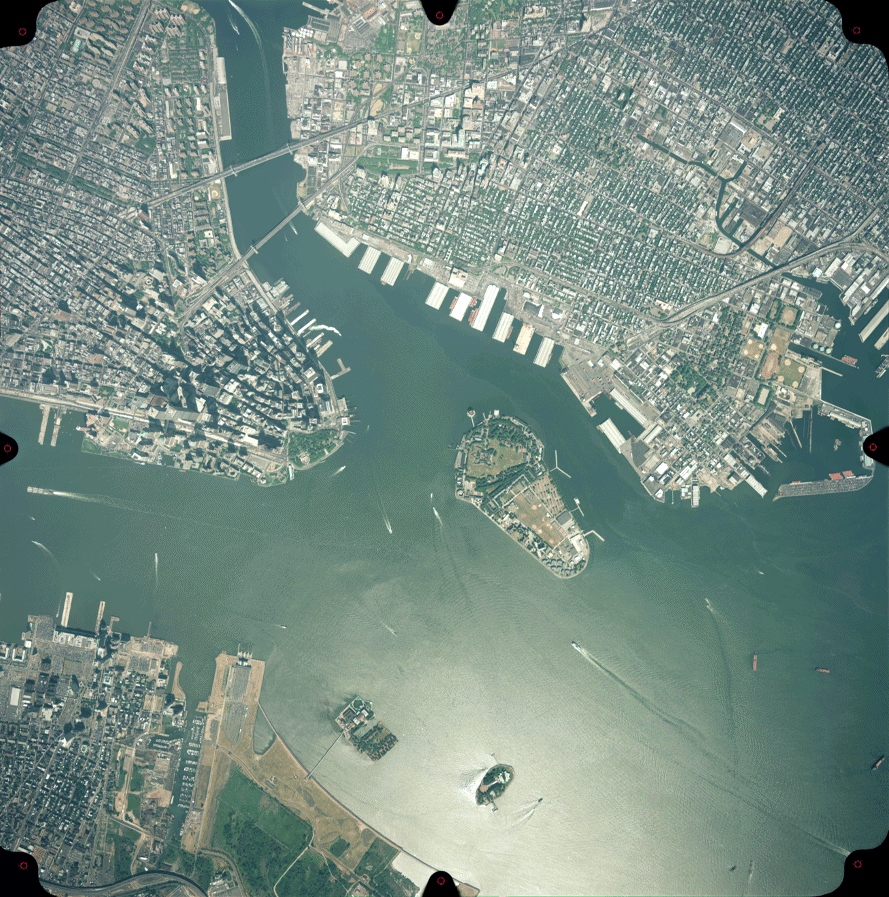
Ellis and Liberty Islands (bottom center) in Upper New York Bay at the mouth of the Hudson River (left) near Liberty State Park, seen in 1999

The national monument is located in Upper New York Bay, east of Liberty State Park in Jersey City, New Jersey, and southwest of Battery Park at the tip of Manhattan in New York City. Entrance is free, but there is a charge for the ferry service that all visitors must use.

In 2007, a concession was granted to Statue City Cruises to operate the transportation and ticketing facilities, replacing the Circle Line which had operated the service since 1953. The waters are patrolled by the U.S. Park Police to enforce the restriction on private boat landings. Ferries depart from both parks and all boats stop at both islands, enabling passengers to visit both islands and choose either destination on the return trip.

Tickets can be purchased at Castle Clinton in Battery Park or at the Communipaw Terminal in Liberty State Park. Along with the ferry ticket, visitors intending to enter the statue's pedestal must also obtain a complimentary ticket. Those wishing to climb the 154 stairs to the crown within the statue must obtain a special ticket, which may be reserved up to a year in advance. Ten people per group, three groups per hour, are permitted to ascend, allowing for a total of 240 per day. After an obligatory second security screening, they may bring only medication and cameras, leaving all other items in lockers provided. Visitors intending to tour Ellis Island's south side, namely the Ellis Island Immigrant Hospital, must purchase a "Hard Hat Tour" ticket, which charges an additional fee on top of the regular ferry ticket.

In 2019, the NPS announced that starting on May 16, 2019, tour groups will be banned from certain parts of the Statue of Liberty National Monument, such as the Statue of Liberty's observation deck and the Ellis Island museum. The NPS cited overcrowding for its decision. Although only 1,000 of the site's 24,000 daily visitors travel to the monument within tour groups, the NPS stated that these groups tend to block pedestrian flow within the monument. After Statue City Cruises' ferry landing at Liberty State Park was partly sunk during a 2020 storm, a temporary landing was added at the Central Railroad of New Jersey Terminal. While repairs to the barge took place, ferry service from Liberty State Park to the monument was halted from January to March of each year.

=== Jurisdiction ===
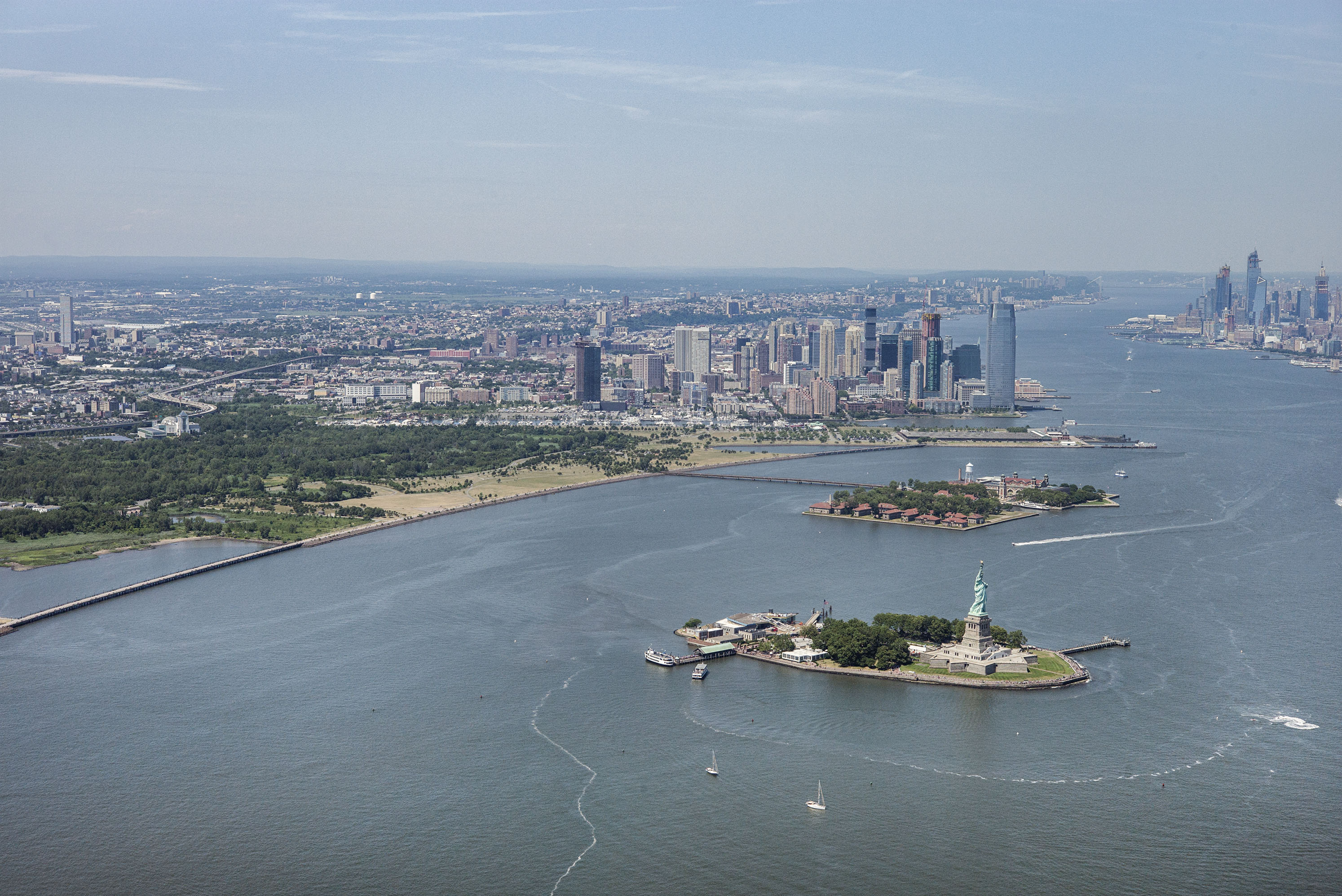
Aerial photograph of Liberty and Ellis Island in 2018. Jersey City is in the background.

Liberty Island and Ellis Island have been the property of the United States government since 1800 and 1808, respectively. Historical circumstances have led to the unusual situation of Liberty Island and 3.3 acres (13,000 m^{2}) of Ellis Island being exclaves of New York, both completely surrounded by New Jersey. The dominion, jurisdiction, and sovereignty of the islands have variously been the subject of a colonial land grant, a provincial governor's directive, and an interstate compact, as well as several court cases and a U.S. Supreme Court decision. The result of which is that the natural land masses including Liberty Island and the original acreage on Ellis Island are part of New York City, and the 24 acres (97,000 m^{2}) created by land reclamation at Ellis Island belongs to New Jersey, all surrounded by the municipal borders of Jersey City. Jurisdiction not superseded by the federal government falls to the appropriate state.

=== Superintendents ===
Sources:

- John Townsley 1965–1967
- Henry Schmidt 1967–1970
- Jerry Wagers 1970–1971
- "Administration supervised by New York District Office from 12/26/1971 to 1/06/1974" Possibly overseen in this time by James Godbolt.
- William Hendrickson 1974–1975
- Appears to have not been an acting superintendent between Hendrickson and Moffit.
- David Moffit 1977–1987
- Kevin Buckley 1987–1990
- Myra Harrison 1990-1990
- Meridith Belkov 1990–1996
- Diane Dayson 1996–2003
- Cynthia Garrett 2003–2009
- David Luchsinger 2009–2013
- John Piltzecker 2013–

== Related sites ==
- Battery Park – entrance to the New York ferry to the monument
  - Castle Clinton – the New York ticket office
- Liberty State Park – entrance to the New Jersey ferry to the monument
  - Communipaw Terminal – the New Jersey ticket office
- Governors Island – another island in New York Harbor
  - Governors Island National Monument – a national monument on Governors Island

== See also ==
- Conservation-restoration of the Statue of Liberty
- Geography of New York Harbor
- Immigration Act of 1924
- List of national monuments of the United States
- National Register of Historic Places listings in Hudson County, New Jersey
- National Register of Historic Places listings in New York County, New York
