= Lorie Conway =

American film director

Lorie Conway is an American independent producer and filmmaker. Her work has received Peabody, DuPont and CableACE awards. In 1993–94, she was a Nieman Fellow at Harvard University; she served for eight years as Vice President of the Nieman Foundation Advisory Board and has served for ten years as an Associate of the Boston Public Library. Lorie Conway's work on Forgotten Ellis Island, the first film and book about the Ellis Island Immigrant Hospital, was supported by three grants from the National Endowment for the Humanities. For over two years, her production company, Boston Film and Video, filmed the former hospital complex on Ellis Island. Recent film projects includes Beatrice Mtetwa and the Rule of Law, about one of the bravest lawyers in Africa—who has been defending victims of Robert Mugabe's brutal regime in Zimbabwe. Tiny Ripples of Hope, a sequel to that film, is currently in development about a school named after Mtetwa which is teaching students about their human rights in Uganda.

Filmography:

*In development, "Hope is a Powerful Weapon," a feature-length documentary based on the prison letters of Nelson Mandela

*In development, ELLIS, a dramatic series about the politics of immigration as 12 million Europeans streamed onto Ellis Island at the turn of the 20th century; the series will be partially based on Forgotten Ellis Island, which told the lost story of the massive immigrant hospital on Ellis*Everyonestory-Stories Worth Sharing, web based video series featuring profiles of individuals who live among us but whom we rarely encounter beyond an anonymous presence

*Beatrice Mtetwa and the Rule of Law, distributed by Journeyman Films, screened on four continents

- Undaunted, Chasing History at the Boston Marathon
- Forgotten Ellis Island (film): The Extraordinary Story of America's Immigrant Hospital and book by the same name, PBS, Amazon
- Fabulous Fenway, narrated by Mike Barnicle, a commemorative history about the Boston Red Sox and the oldest ballpark in the American League
- Thus Galbraith, narrated by William F. Buckley, a biography of the political economist, John Kenneth Galbraith
- Boston, the Way it Was, a two-hour social history of Boston post WW 2
- The Jews of Boston, a documentary history narrated by Leonard Nimoy, who grew up in the West End of Boston
- The Incredible Voyage of Bill Pinkney, Peabody Award winning documentary film about the first African-American to sail solo around the world
