= William Williams =

William Williams may refer to:

== Academics ==
- William Mattieu Williams (1820–1892), English writer on science
- William Williams (veterinary surgeon) (1832–1900), Welsh veterinary surgeon
- William Henry Williams (headmaster) (1852–1941), English-born Australian headmaster and professor
- W. Roger Williams (1854–1948), English pathologist, surgeon, cancer researcher and medical writer
- William Williams (doctor) (1855/6–1911), Welsh doctor and writer on sanitation issues
- William Owen Williams (1860–1911), British veterinarian
- William T. B. Williams (1869-1941), dean at the Tuskegee Institute
- William Williams (surveyor) (1901–1995), British academic at Cambridge
- W. T. Williams (William Thomas Williams, 1913–1995), English and Australian botanist and plant taxonomist
- William Williams (metallurgist) (1927–2011), Canadian metallurgical engineer
- William Morgan Williams, presenter of a 1969 Frazer Lecture

== Art and entertainment ==
- William Williams Pantycelyn (1717–1791), Welsh composer of hymns
- William Williams (artist) (1727–1791), artist and author of American novel Penrose
- William Williams (antiquary) (Gwilym Ddu o Arfon, 1739–1817), Welsh historian and poet
- William Joseph Williams (1759–1823), American painter
- William Williams (Gwilym Cyfeiliog) (1801–1883), Welsh poet and hymnwriter
- William Williams (Carw Coch) (1808–1872, bardic name Carw Coch), Welsh literary figure
- William Williams (Creuddynfab) (1814–1869), Welsh poet and literary critic
- William Aubrey Williams (1834–1891, bardic name Gwilym Gwent), Welsh composer
- William Williams (Crwys) (1875–1968, bardic name Crwys), Welsh-language poet
- Billy Williams (music hall performer) (1878–1915), vaudeville entertainer
- William Carlos Williams (1883–1963), American poet
- William Emrys Williams (1896–1977), known as Bill, editor-in-chief of Penguin Books, 1936–1965
- W. S. Gwynn Williams (William Sidney Gwynn Williams, 1896–1978), Welsh musician
- William B. Williams (DJ) (1923–1986), disc jockey on New York City radio station WNEW
- Billy Williams (cinematographer) (1929–2025), British cinematographer
- Bill Williams (journalist) (1934–2025), American television journalist
- Billy Dee Williams (born 1937), American actor
- William T. Williams (born 1942), New York painter
- Willie Williams (set designer) (born 1959), British theatrical stage set, lighting designer and video director

== Military ==
- William Peere Williams-Freeman (1742–1832), Royal Navy officer and admiral of the fleet
- William Williams (printer and publisher) (1787–1850), American printer, publisher and colonel during the War of 1812
- William Williams (soldier) (died 1815), killed in defense of Fort McHenry during the War of 1812
- William Fenwick Williams (1800–1883), Canadian-born British military leader
- William Orton Williams (1839–1863), Confederate officer executed as a spy
- William Williams (Medal of Honor) (1840–1893), Medal of Honor recipient of the American Civil War
- William Haliday Williams (1845–1916), American Civil War soldier and Medal of Honor recipient
- William Charles Williams (1880–1915), Victoria Cross recipient of the First World War
- William Williams (VC) (1890–1965), Victoria Cross recipient of the First World War
- William Williams (naval officer), American naval officer in the American Revolution

== Politics ==
=== U.S. ===
- William Williams (Connecticut politician) (1731–1811), US Continental Congressman
- William M. Williams (Texas politician) (1809–1859), politician in the Texas House and Senate
- William B. Williams (Mississippi politician), served 1870-1871
- William Williams (Massachusetts politician) (1814–1887), mayor of Gloucester, Massachusetts in 1879 and 1882
- William Williams (New York politician) (1815–1876), US Representative from New York
- William Williams (Indiana politician) (1821–1896), US Representative from Indiana
- William B. Williams (Michigan politician) (1826–1905), US Representative from Michigan
- William M. Williams Jr. (1846–?), member of the Wisconsin State Assembly
- William E. Williams (1857–1921), U.S. Representative from Illinois
- William B. Williams (Oklahoma politician) (1859/1860–1931), member of the Oklahoma House of Representatives
- William R. Williams (1884–1972), US Representative from the state of New York
- William Reid Williams (1866–1931), US Assistant Secretary of War
- William White Williams (born 1947), American white nationalist
- William Williams (surgeon) (1856–1919), Surgeon General
- William Williams (commissioner) (1862–1947), Commissioner of Immigration, Ellis Island
- William R. Williams (California politician), California State Treasurer, 1907–1911
- Bill K. Williams (1943–2019), American politician

=== UK ===
- Sir William Williams, 6th Baronet (died 1696), Welsh politician
- Sir William Williams, 1st Baronet, of Gray's Inn (1634–1700), Welsh lawyer and politician, speaker of the House of Commons
- Sir William Williams, 2nd Baronet, of Gray's Inn (1665–1740), Welsh politician, Member of Parliament (MP) for Denbigh, 1708–1710
- William Peere Williams (1664–1736), MP for Bishop's Castle, 1722–1727
- Sir William Williams, 2nd Baronet, of Clapton (1730–1761), MP for New Shoreham, 1758–1751
- William Addams Williams (1787–1861), British Member of Parliament for Monmouthshire
- William Williams (Radical politician) (1788–1865), Welsh businessman based in London, Radical MP 1835–1847 and 1850–1865
- William Williams (Swansea MP) (1840–1904), British Member of Parliament for Swansea District 1893–1895
- William Williams (Labour politician) (1895–1963), British civil servant and politician
- Thomas Williams (Warrington MP) (William Thomas Williams, 1915–1986), British Member of Parliament for Warrington
- William Williams (Weymouth MP) (1774–1839), British Member of Parliament for Weymouth and Melcombe Regis
- W. Llewelyn Williams (1867–1922), Welsh journalist, lawyer and Liberal Party politician

=== Other countries ===
- William Williams (New South Wales politician) (1856–1947), member of the New South Wales Legislative Assembly
- William Williams (Tasmanian politician) (1851–1924), member of the Tasmanian Legislative Council
- William J. Williams, elected in the Alberta general election, 1944 under the Veterans' and Active Force party banner

== Religion ==
- William Williams (Archdeacon of Cashel) (fl. 17th century), Irish Anglican clergyman
- William Williams of Wern (1781–1840), Welsh Independent minister, promoter of the General Union movement of 1834
- William Williams (bishop) (1800–1878), bishop of Waiapu in New Zealand
- William Williams (Caledfryn) (1801–1869), Welsh Congregational minister, poet and literary critic
- Leonard Williams (bishop) (William Leonard Williams, 1829–1916), of Waiapu in New Zealand
- William Augustine Williams, African-American linguist, librarian, Catholic seminarian
- William Williams (priest) (1848–1930), Dean of St David's, 1919–1931
- William Williams (Methodist) (1848–1913), minister and naturalist in Victoria, Australia
- William A. Williams (creationist) (1854–1938), American Presbyterian clergyman
- William Williams (missionary) (1859–1892), Welsh missionary to East Khasi Hills, India
- William J. Williams (Methodist) (1884–1956) in Victoria, Australia
- William Richard Williams (theologian) (1896–1962), principal of the United Theological College Aberystwyth

== Sports ==
=== American football ===
- William M. Williams (American football) (1877–1932), head coach of the Clemson college football program in 1897
- J. William Williams (1880–1908), player and coach

=== Australian rules football ===
- Billy Williams (footballer, born 1888) (1888–1946), Australian football player for St Kilda
- Bill Williams (footballer, born 1904) (1904–1993), player for Fitzroy
- Bill Williams (Australian footballer) (1925–2016), player for South Melbourne
- Bill Williams (footballer, born 1929) (1929–2009), player for Richmond and Stawell Gift winner

=== Association football ===
- William Williams (footballer, born 1856) (1856–?), Welsh international footballer in the 1870s and 1880s
- Billy Williams (footballer, born 1876) (1876–1929), former England and West Bromwich Albion footballer
- William Williams (footballer, born 1892) (1892–1926), English footballer
- Bill Williams (1900s footballer), English football player
- Billy Williams (footballer, born 1905) (1905–1994), former West Ham United and Chelsea footballer
- Bill Williams (footballer, born 1942), English football player
- Bill Williams (footballer, born 1960), English football player
- John Williams (footballer, born 1960) (William John Williams), English footballer

=== Athletics ===
- Will Williams (long jumper) (born 1995), American long jumper

=== Baseball ===
- William Williams (baseball) (1916–2009), co-owner of the Cincinnati Reds baseball team
- Billy Williams (umpire) (1930–1998), baseball umpire
- Billy Williams (right fielder) (1932–2013), baseball player for the 1969 Seattle Pilots

=== Cricket ===
- William Williams (cricketer, born 1844) (1844–1885), English cricketer
- Billy Williams (sportsman) (1861–1951), Middlesex and MCC cricketer, also a rugby union player, referee and administrator
- Will Williams (born 1992), New Zealand cricketer

=== Rugby ===
- William Williams (rugby union) (1866–1945), Welsh rugby union footballer in the 1880s and 1890s
- William Henry Williams (rugby union) (1873–1936), Welsh rugby union footballer who played in the 1900s for Wales, Pontymister RFC, and London Welsh RFC
- William Williams (Halifax RLFC) (20th century), Welsh rugby league footballer in the 1900s and 1910s
- Billy Williams (rugby, born 1905) (1905–1973), rugby union and rugby league footballer of the 1920s and 1930s for Great Britain and Wales
- Billy Williams (rugby, born 1925) (1925–2007), Welsh rugby union and rugby league footballer in the 1940s
- Billy Williams (rugby union, born 1929) (1929–2013), Wales and British and Irish Lions international rugby union player

== Other ==
- William S. Williams (1787–1849), mountain man and frontiersman
- William S. Williams, travelled to South Australia on the Cygnet in the First Fleet of South Australia in 1836
- W. Llewelyn Williams (1867–1922), Welsh journalist, lawyer and Liberal politician
- William Muir Williams, judge of the Supreme Court of Missouri in 1898
- William Williams (murderer) (1877–1906), last person executed by Minnesota
- William M. Williams, US Commissioner of Internal Revenue 1920–1921
- William Emrys Williams (1896–1977), British educationalist and editor-in-chief of Penguin Books
- William Appleman Williams (1921–1990), American historian
- William Williams (brewer), settler and brewer in the Province of South Australia
- William Williams, a character in 2006 film American Dreamz
- William "Fat Tony" Williams, original name of The Simpsons (1989-) character Fat Tony
- Willie Williams (murderer) (1956–2005), American murderer

== See also ==
- Sir William Williams (disambiguation)
- Sir William Williams, 1st Baronet (disambiguation)
- William J. Williams (disambiguation)
- William Peere Williams (disambiguation)
- William Thomas Williams (disambiguation)
- Willie Williams (disambiguation)
- Bill Williams (disambiguation)
- Billy Williams (disambiguation)
- William J. McWilliams, from Secretary of State of Maryland in 1956
