= Will Williams (disambiguation) =

Will Williams (born 1992) is a New Zealand and English cricketer.

Will Williams may also refer to:

- Will Williams (long jumper), American long jumper (born 1995)
- William White Williams, American white nationalist (born 1947)

== See also ==
- Bill Williams (disambiguation)
- Billy Williams (disambiguation)
- William Williams (disambiguation)
- Sir William Williams (disambiguation)
- Sir William Williams, 1st Baronet (disambiguation)
- William J. Williams (disambiguation)
- William Peere Williams (disambiguation)
- William Thomas Williams (disambiguation)
- Willie Williams (disambiguation)
