= Billy Williams (disambiguation) =

Billy Williams (born 1938) is an American Hall of Fame baseball player.

Billy Williams may also refer to:

== Entertainment ==
- Billy Dee Williams (born 1937), American actor
- Billy Drease Williams, American hip hop emcee and producer
- Billy Williams (music hall performer) (1878–1915), vaudeville entertainer
- Billy Williams (singer) (1910–1972), R&B singer
- Billy Williams (cinematographer) (1929–2025), British cinematographer
- Billy Williams (record producer), American country music producer

== Sports ==
=== Baseball and cricket ===
- Billy Williams (sportsman) (1861–1951), Middlesex and MCC cricketer, also a rugby union player, referee and administrator
- Billy Williams (cricketer, born 1887) (1887–1966), Yorkshire cricketer
- Billy Williams (right fielder) (1932–2013), baseball player for the 1969 Seattle Pilots
- Billy Williams (umpire) (1930–1998), baseball umpire

=== Football and rugby ===
- Billy Williams (American football) (born 1971), American football player
- Billy Williams (footballer, born 1888) (1888–1946), Australian football player for St Kilda
- Billy Williams (footballer, born 1896) (1896–?), Welsh international footballer
- Billy Williams (footballer, born 1876) (1876–1929), former England and West Bromwich Albion footballer
- Billy Williams (footballer, born 1905) (1905–1994), former West Ham United and Chelsea footballer
- Billy Williams (rugby, born 1905) (1905–1973), rugby union and rugby league footballer of the 1920s and 1930s for Great Britain and Wales
- Billy Williams (rugby union, born 1921) (1921–2002), Welsh international rugby union player
- Billy Williams (rugby union, born 1929) (1929–2013), Wales and British and Irish Lions international rugby union player
- William Williams (Halifax RLFC), or Billy Williams (20th century), Welsh rugby league player for Wales and Halifax RLFC
- Billy Williams (rugby, born 1925) (1925–2007), Welsh rugby league and rugby union player

=== Other sports ===
- Billy Williams (coach) (1892–1973), American football, basketball, and baseball coach and college athletics administrator
- Billy Williams (basketball) (born 1958), retired American basketball player

== Others ==
- Billy Gray Williams (1965–2024), American hitman
- Billy J. Williams (born 1956), United States Attorney for the District of Oregon
- Billy Williams (Coronation Street), in the UK TV soap opera Coronation Street, played by Frank Mills
- Billy Williams, Australian High Commissioner to Ghana from 2008 to 2013

== See also ==
- Bill Williams (disambiguation)
- William Williams (disambiguation)
