= Bill Williams =

Bill Williams may refer to:

== Entertainment ==
- Bill Williams (actor) (1915–1992), American film actor
- Bill Williams (game designer) (1960–1998), designer and programmer of Atari 8-bit computer and Amiga video games

== History ==
- Old Bill Williams (William Sherley Williams, 1787–1849), American mountain man frontiersman
- James Howard Williams (1897–1958), also known as Elephant Bill, British soldier and elephant expert in Burma

== Sports ==
- Bill Williams (1900s footballer), English football player
- Bill Williams (Australian footballer) (1925–2016), Australian rules footballer for South Melbourne
- Bill Williams (footballer, born 1904) (1904–1993), Australian rules footballer for Fitzroy
- Bill Williams (footballer, born 1929) (1929–2009), Australian rules footballer for Richmond and Stawell Gift winner
- Bill Williams (footballer, born 1942), English football player
- Bill Williams (footballer, born 1960), English football player
- Bill Williams (pole vaulter) (born 1920), American pole vaulter, 1940 NCAA runner-up for the Wisconsin Badgers track and field team

== Other ==
- Bill Williams (priest) (1914–1990), Anglican priest and author
- Bill Williams (journalist) (1934–2025), American television journalist
- Bill Williams (trader) (1932–2019), American trader
- Bill K. Williams (1943–2019), American politician
- William Emrys Williams (1896–1977), known as Bill, editor-in-chief of Penguin Books, 1936–1965
- Edgar Williams (1912–1995), known as Bill, British Army officer and Oxford academic at Rhodes House
- Bill Williams Peak, the mountain that is the high point of the Williams Mountains in the U.S. State of Colorado
- Bill Williams River, a river in the western half of the U.S State of Arizona draining into the Colorado River

== See also ==
- Billy Williams (disambiguation)
- William Williams (disambiguation)
