= William Williams (commissioner) =

Commissioner of Ellis Island

William William Williams
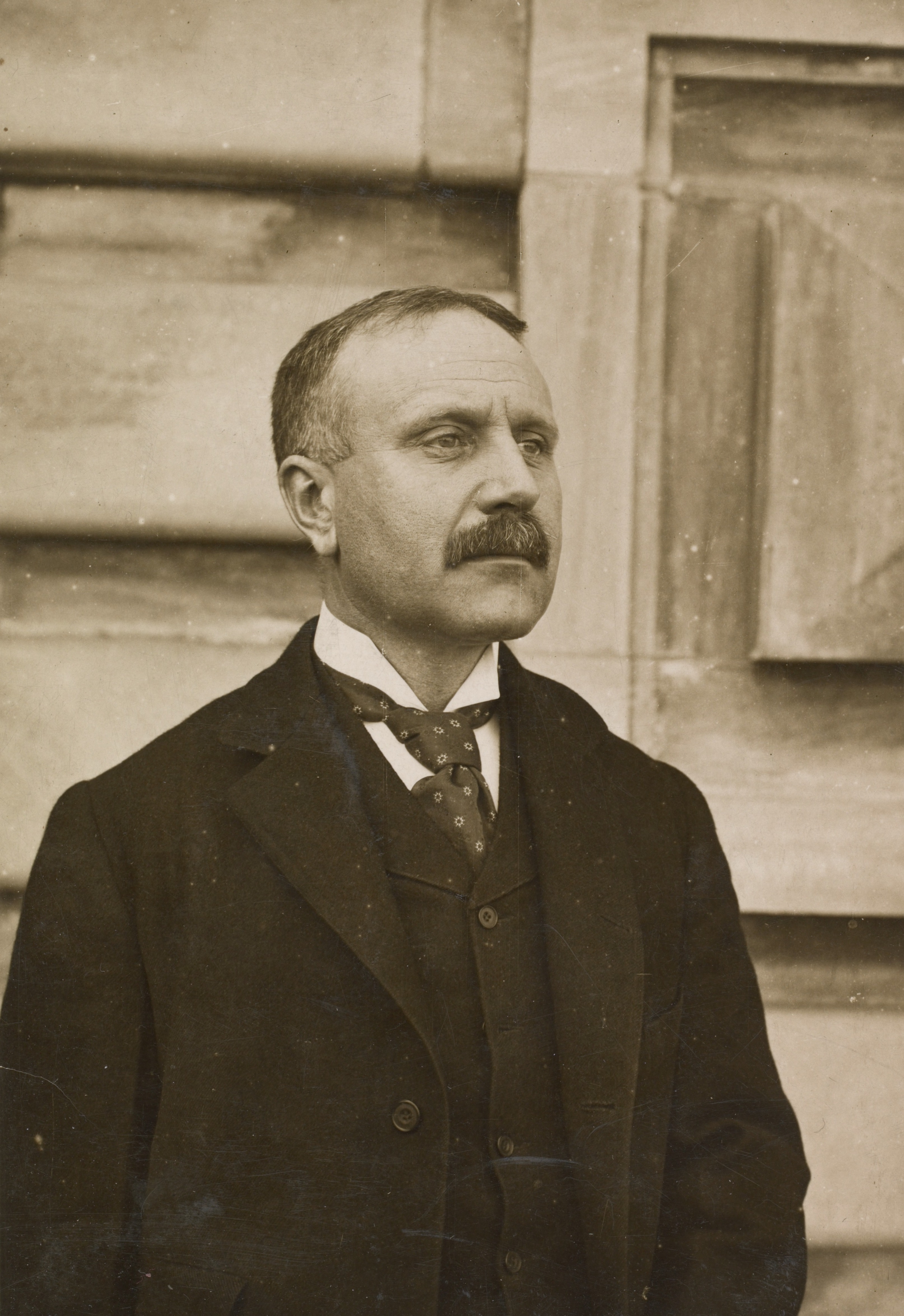
- Born: June 2, 1862; New London, Connecticut
- Died: February 8, 1947 (aged 84); New York, New York
- Occupation(s): Lawyer, public official

William Williams (June 2, 1862 – February 8, 1947) was the federal commissioner of immigration for the Port of New York, from 1902 to 1905 and again, from 1909 to 1914. His office was on Ellis Island, which was the location of the nation's most important immigrant inspection station.

== Early life ==
The son of Charles Augustus Williams (1829-1899), a prominent merchant in the whaling industry, and Elizabeth Hoyt Williams, William C. Williams was born New London, Connecticut, on June 2, 1862. He had one sister, Mary Hoyt Williams Crozier (1864-1955), who became the wife of Gen. William Crozier, the noted artillerist and inventor. Williams grew up in Connecticut, Hawaii, Japan and Germany. He attended college in Germany and the United States. He graduated from Yale University with a bachelor's degree and earned a law degree from Harvard University.

== Career ==
In the 1890s, he briefly served the United States in the consular service, and served as a soldier during the Spanish–American War until he contracted typhoid fever in 1898.

In the few years between his service as a soldier in the Spanish–American War and his appointment as Commissioner of Ellis Island, William Williams led a profitable career as a lawyer on Wall Street. In 1902, he was chosen by President Theodore Roosevelt to assume the position of commissioner of the immigration at the port of New York, with his headquarters on Ellis Island, which was the location of the U.S. Immigrant Station which served that port. Feeling that corruption at Ellis Island was interfering with national goals for immigration restriction, Roosevelt chose Williams because of their shared beliefs in the Progressive movement, their faith in science as a source of authority, and honest, efficient public service.

=== Commissionership ===
In the decades before Williams began his work as commissioner, federal officials worked to improve the medical exclusion of immigrants in the interest of public health. Beginning with the Immigration Act of 1882, Congress acted to exclude immigrants with mental and physical defects. The Act specifically prohibited any "lunatic, idiot, or any person unable to take care of himself or herself without becoming a public charge." The public charge clause was intentionally vague to allow the examining officer's to discriminate at their own discretion. As the eugenics movement and popular fears regarding race escalated, a new law was passed (Immigration Act of 1891) that rephrased the public charge clause to be a matter of likelihood of becoming a public charge (or LPC). A year before Williams began as Commissioner, Congress moved immigration responsibilities from the Treasury Department to the newly created Department of Commerce and Labor. The country began to understand immigration as something more than just a form of importation, due to its significant influence on many aspects of the public welfare, especially the public's health.

Williams' first action as Commissioner was to eliminate the many illegal and inefficient administrative practices at Ellis Island. Working with immigration officials and friends from Wall Street, he dressed his trustworthy supporters as immigrants and had them undergo full inspection procedures. This helped uncover corrupt health inspectors who would bribe newcomers with fraudulent naturalization papers in exchange for money. Such papers would allow immigrants pose as American citizens to bypass a true medical examination, thereby undermining the immigration port's goal of preventing foreign diseases from entering the country. Similar scams involved immigration officials allowing ship with infectious passengers to land. Williams subsequently fired these officials.

Federal physicians tasked with certifying the health of new arrivals at immigration stations were members of the United States Marine Hospital Service (which was renamed the U.S. Public Health and Marine Hospital Service after 1902 and renamed again as the U.S. Public Health Service in 1912). When William Williams began his position as Commissioner of Ellis Island, he found that the surgeon general had only assigned eight U.S. PHS physicians and a single steward to conduct the physical examination of the 497,791 steerage passengers and 68,192 cabin passengers. Even by 1905, this number only increased to sixteen physicians at Ellis Island. These physicians conducted the line examinations, operated the immigrant hospital, and conducted the examinations of cabin passengers aboard incoming ships. Despite this, PHS physicians prided themselves on conducting medical exams with efficiency and impartiality.

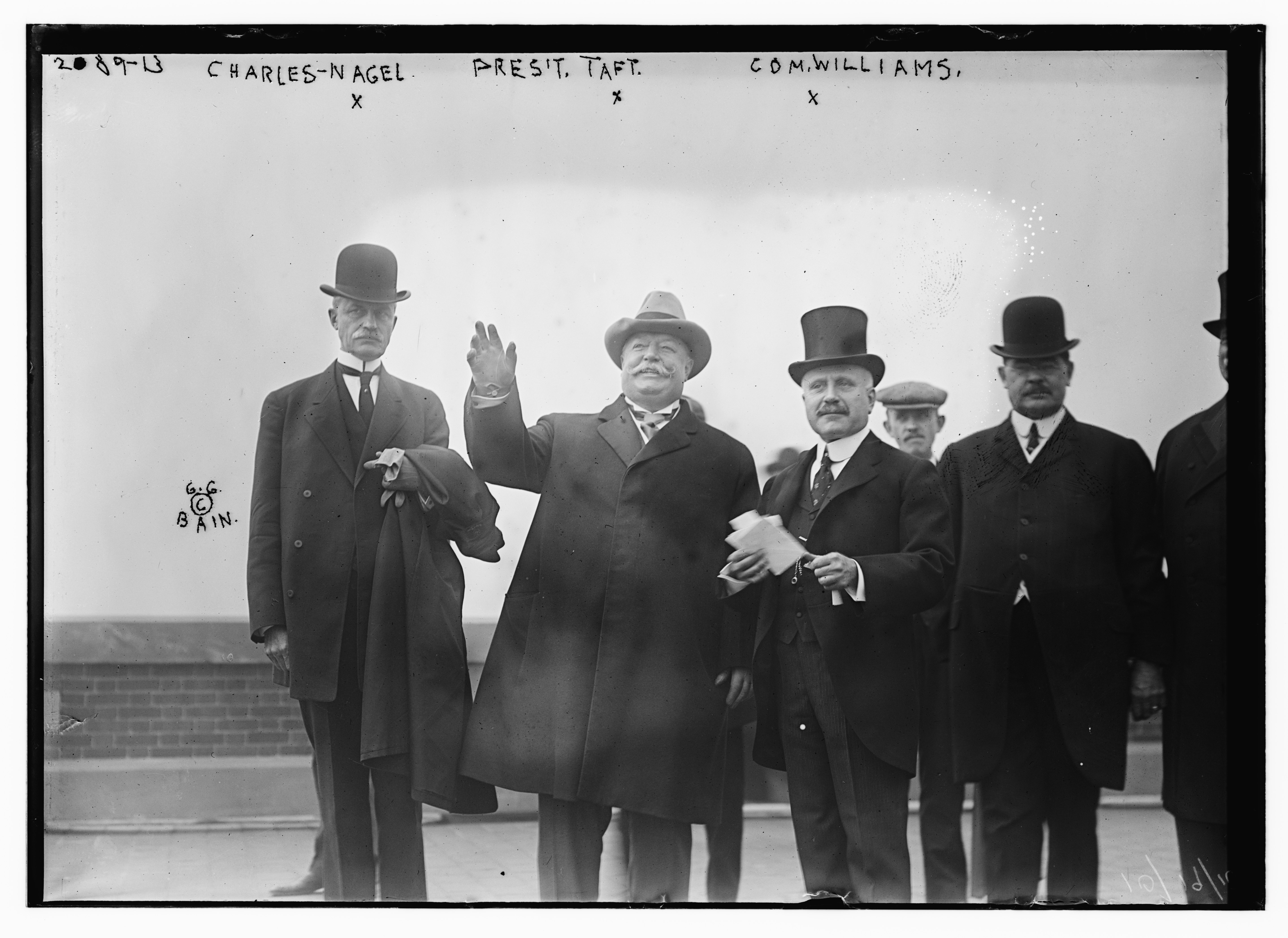
Williams (right) with President William Howard Taft (middle) and Secretary of Commerce Charles Nagel (left) on Ellis Island in 1910.

Williams was quite vocal about his goals for immigration policy at Ellis Island. In his Annual Report of 1904, he expressed his belief that the U.S. was "receiving too many immigrants whose physical condition is poor." He argued that the LPC clause did not exclude enough, saying that "it is obviously impossible to exclude on this ground all persons whose physical condition is poor" and he urged officials to exclude all cases of immigrants with "poor physique".

Congress passed a new law (34 Stat. 898) that gave physicians the option of stating on a medical certificate whether a certain sickness or deformity could make a newcomer "likely to become a public charge". With this, lawmakers had hoped to pass the responsibilities of excluding immigrants from themselves to physicians, who could use scientific, "objective" medical criteria to justify restrictive immigration policies.

Such measures were bitterly opposed by immigrants' rights organizations and by those who favored less restrictive immigration policy. Groups such as the Jewish Immigrant Aid Society in New York proved to be direct opponents for Williams' administrative goals by appealing every case in which a Jewish immigrant was excluded. Many more societies focuses on appealing to Congress to make immigration inspections more lax. Occasionally, charges would be made against immigration inspectors such as Williams, bringing allegations of cruelty and misfeasance against them, an action taken by the New York Journal. Williams was unimpeded however, being completely exonerated from such charges.

While the above charges proved fruitless, Williams' goal of enhancing administrative efficiency and science-based social control was more frequently undermined by the PHS officials working for him at Ellis Island, who often refused to be agents of exclusion. At Ellis Island and many other ports, these physicians were very reluctant to go beyond the role of physicians making medical diagnoses by involving themselves in the decision to debar certain types of immigrants. Additionally, PHS physicians refused to sit on boards of special inquiry, where final decisions on the exclusion of immigrants were made. Physicians tried to keep their medical assessments separate from final decisions to accept or deport immigrants, and persistently refused to sacrifice the ethics of their profession for the sake of political bureaucracy.

William Williams died in New York City on February 8, 1947.

== See also ==
William Williams papers, 1902-1943 [bulk 1902-1917, Archives and Manuscripts, New York Public Library.

Annual report of Commissioner Williams in reference to Ellis Island affairs for the year ended, 1910, Open Collections Program, Widener Library, Harvard University.
