= Gertrude Williams =

Gertrude Williams may refer to:

- Gertrude Rosenblum Williams, economist and social strategist
- Gertrude Marvin Williams, American biographer and journalist
