= Yamataya v. Fisher =

- Supreme Court of the United States

Argued February 24, 1903 Decided April 6, 1903
- Full case name: Kaoru Yamataya v. Thomas M. Fisher
- Citations: 189 U.S. 86 (more) 23 S. Ct. 611; 47 L. Ed. 721

Case history
- Prior: Board of Special Inquiry found Yamataya to be in violation of the Immigration Act of 1891 and was subject to deportation.

Holding
- The courts may not interfere with a pending deportation unless the administrative hearing was unfair, but procedures are subject to constitutional scrutiny under the Fifth Amendment's Due Process Clause.

Court membership
- Chief Justice Melville Fuller Associate Justices John M. Harlan · David J. Brewer; Henry B. Brown · Edward D. White; Rufus W. Peckham · Joseph McKenna; Oliver W. Holmes Jr. · William R. Day

Case opinions
- Majority: Harlan, joined by Fuller, Brown, White, McKenna, Holmes, Day
- Dissent: Brewer, Peckham

Laws applied
- Immigration Act of 1891

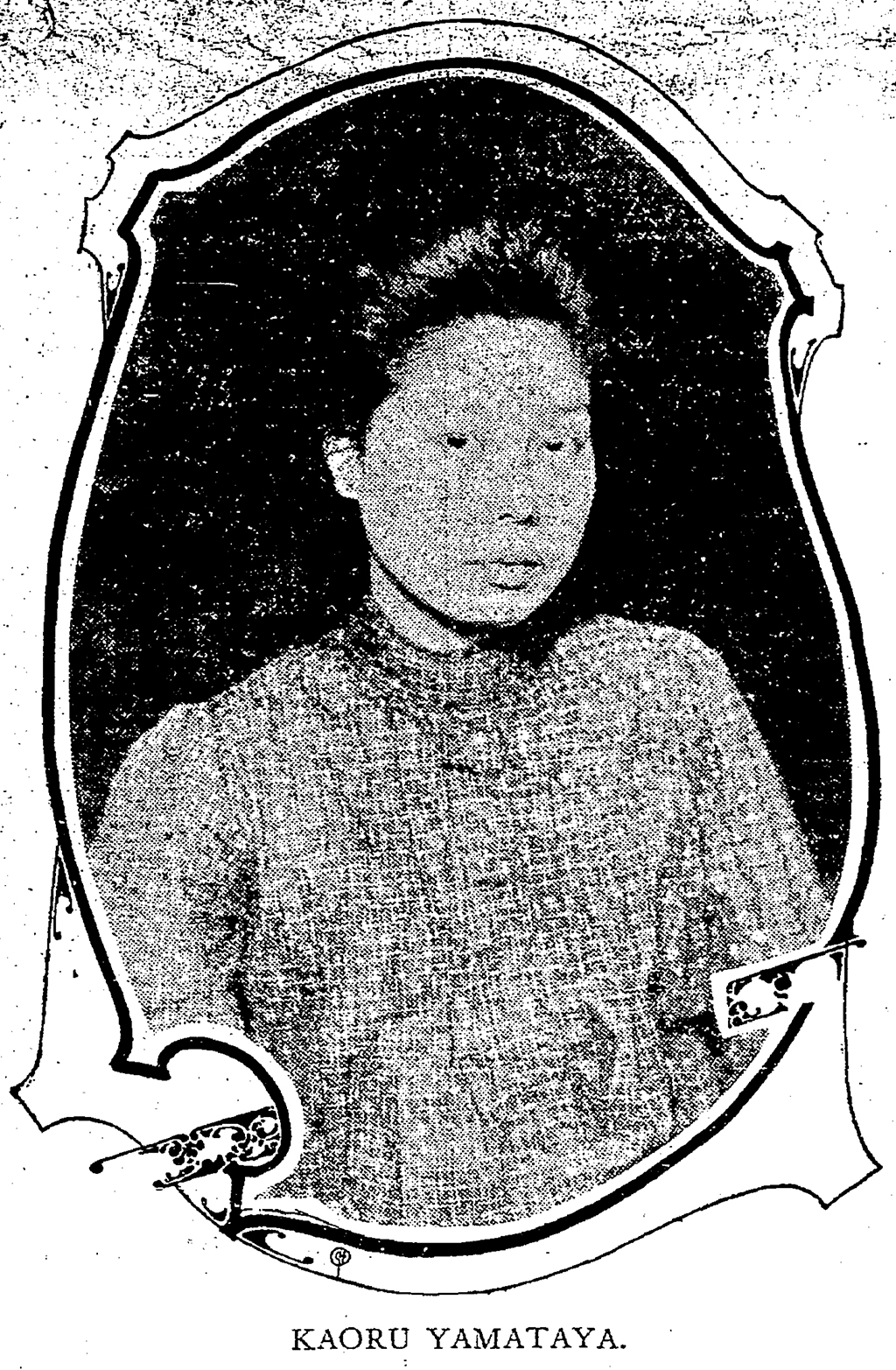
Kaoru Yamataya, c. 1906

Yamataya v. Fisher, 189 U.S. 86 (1903), popularly known as the Japanese Immigrant Case, is a Supreme Court of the United States case about the federal government's power to exclude and deport certain classes of alien immigrants under the Immigration Act of 1891. The Supreme Court held that the courts may not interfere with a pending deportation unless the administrative hearing was unfair. However, deportation procedures are subject to constitutional scrutiny, under the Due Process Clause.

The case was the first time that the Supreme Court allowed judicial review of a procedural due process claim.

== Background ==
The passing of the Chinese Exclusion Act of 1882 restricted Chinese immigration to the United States but also provided for the deportation of Chinese immigrants who entered the United States in violation of the exclusion laws. In 1892, Congress passed the Geary Act which significantly expanded deportation under Chinese exclusion by introducing a system of residence certificates for all laborers of Chinese descent. Laborer who did not have a certificate at a deportation hearing would be deported. The Immigration Act of 1882 allowed for the exclusion and deportation of immigrants if they were immoral, criminal, mentally defective, or unable to support themselves. In 1891, Congress extended the federal government's power to deport immigrants by adding categories of excludable and deportable immigrants to include idiots, the insane, paupers, polygamists, those likely to become a public charge, those convicted of a felony or some other crime, and those suffering from contagious diseases. In 1903, Congress passed another general immigration act, which added anarchists and political radicals to the list of both excludable and deportable immigrants.

General immigration deportations were heard before a Board of Special Inquiry staffed by three immigration officers. Appeals went to a Board of Special Inquiry and then to the Secretary of the department that controlled the Bureau of Immigration.

== Case ==
Kaoru Yamataya was a fifteen-year-old pregnant girl from Japan when she landed in Seattle on July 11, 1901. Four days after her arrival, immigration authorities arrested and detained Yamataya on the grounds that she had entered the country illegally and was likely to become a public charge. The 1891 Immigration Act excluded any immigrant who was deemed likely to become a public charge. On July 26, 1901, a Board of Special Inquiry of three immigration officials convened to hear her case and found Yamataya deportable. Yamataya appealed her deportation through the court and eventually, her case was heard by the US Supreme Court. While awaiting the outcome of her case, Yamataya had a baby boy who died of pneumonia two months later. In addition, the man who had accompanied her, Masataro Yamataya, was tried and found not guilty of bringing a woman into the country for immoral purposes.

== Argument ==
Yamataya's appeal, argued by Harold Preston, used three key arguments:

- Since the Immigration Act of 1891 "did not explicitly provide for due process," the act was unconstitutional.
- The appeals process for deportations went to the Secretary of Labor, whose decision was final and not reviewable in court.
- The immigration agents denied Yamataya her Fifth Amendment rights of due process as the evidence against her was "garbled, incomplete, and in many respects misleading and untrue;" the hearing was conducted in English, which she did not speak, and she was investigated without her having access to a legal counsel or having a chance to show that she was not likely to become a public charge.

== Decision ==
Justice Harlan gave the opinion of the court and dismissed Yamataya's appeal. The Supreme Court upheld the law although it had no explicit provisions for due process. The Court did not discuss whether the exclusion and deportation of a certain class of immigrants violated any constitutional rights. Justice Harlan wrote that an act of Congress "must be taken to be constitutional unless the contrary plainly and palpably appears."

The Supreme Court also held that the appeals process under the law was constitutional. While the appeals process was not reviewable by the courts, the Court found that the immigration law still provided sufficient trial and appellate tribunals. It agreed with the government's assertion of administrative competency by holding that the investigations and actions of the executive offices in the deportation process were not "subject to judicial review."

Additionally, the Supreme Court upheld Yamataya's deportation and ruled that the deportation hearings met Fifth Amendment due process rights, as the executive hearing was found to have been in front of immigration agents and to meet the standard of due process. It was also held that even a hearing that an immigrant cannot understand was not a violation of their Fifth Amendment due process rights. For Yamataya, even if the hearing was conducted in English and so she could not understand the proceedings against her, Harlan wrote that "was her misfortune, and constitutes no reason… for the intervention of the courts by habeas corpus." However, the Supreme Court argued that if a person was deported without a hearing, Fifth Amendment due process would be violated and so it provided some ability to go through the courts.

== Significance ==
While Yamataya was ordered to be deported back to Japan, the case significantly altered the appeals process for deportations in the United States. The ruling effectively created an appeals process in deportations under general immigration law. While immigrants could not challenge the outcome of deportation hearings in the courts and judicial system, they could challenge the legitimacy of the procedures. If their procedural due process rights had been violated, immigrants were able to appeal their deportations in the courts. That was a significant shift in deportation appeals process, as individuals had an opportunity to appeal their deportation through the courts, which had been unavailable before the case.

For 50 years, the Supreme Court decisions would continue to use a procedural due process requirement but refuse to overturn government decisions in both exclusion and deportation contexts. The courts remained reluctant to hear any substantive due process constitutional challenges to both the admission and deportation categories established by Congress.

== See also ==
- List of United States immigration legislation
- History of Japanese Americans
- Japanese American
- Asian American
- Japanese in Hawaii
- Yellow Peril
