= Edmund Scarborough (Mississippi politician) =

American politician

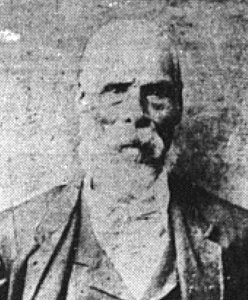
Edmund Scarborough (c.1912)

Edmund Scarborough (May 1840 - ?) was an American minister, farmer and state legislator in Mississippi. He represented Holmes County, Mississippi in the Mississippi House of Representatives in 1870-1871.

He was born enslaved in Greene County, Alabama in May 1840 and obtained his freedom in 1863. Eric Foner documented him as Edmond Scarborough and another newspaper listed him as Edward Scarborough.

He was married to Martha in 1857, with whom he was listed as living with in Holmes County in both the 1900 and 1910 census.

In 1866, he built, along with his brother-in-law, the first "negro" Methodist church in the county.

He served in the Mississippi House with William B. Williams and Cicero Mitchell from Holmes County. At the 1875 Holmes County Republican Convention, he was assigned the position of Cotton Weigher.

After his service to the legislature, he was a Deacon Elder of his church in which position he was reported to have baptised 500 people.

He died sometime after 1912, at which point he was recorded as owning multiple urban lots and other property.

== See also ==
- African American officeholders from the end of the Civil War until before 1900
