= Peere =

Peere may be,

- Peere language

== People ==
- William Peere Williams (disambiguation), several people
- Abraham van Peere
