= Public charge rule =

Term used in the US to refer to immigrants unlikely to be able to earn a living

Under the public charge rule, immigrants to the United States classified as Likely or Liable to become a Public Charge may be denied visas or permission to enter the country due to their disabilities or lack of economic resources. The term was introduced in the Immigration Act of 1882. The restriction has remained a major cause for denial of visas and lawful permanent residency ever since; in 1992, about half of those denied immigrant and non-immigrant visas for substantive reasons were denied due to the public charge rule. However, the administrative definition of "public charge" has been subject to major changes, notably in 1999 and 2019.

== Laws regarding immigrants likely to become a public charge ==
The Immigration Act of 1882 found immigrants who were "unable to take care of himself or herself without becoming a public charge" unsuitable for American citizenship and therefore denied their entry. In addition to the liable to public charge, the act initiated a fifty cent head tax which would be used for bureaucratic processes. The act also denies entry of convicts.

The Immigration Act of 1891 continued this exclusion:

The following classes of aliens shall be excluded from admission into the United States ... All idiots, insane persons, paupers or persons likely to become a public charge, persons suffering from a loathsome or a dangerous contagious disease, persons who have been convicted of a felony or other infamous crime or misdemeanor involving moral turpitude, polygamists…

The Immigration Act of 1903 allowed the deportation of immigrants who became a public charge within their first two years in the country.

In its 1915 decision in Gegiow v. Uhl, the US Supreme Court found that the public charge restriction applied exclusively to those immigrants who "by reason of poverty, insanity, disease or disability would become a charge upon the public."

The Immigration and Nationality Act (enacted in 1952, and amended in 1965) declares "any alien likely at any time to become a public charge" as inadmissible to the country and those who have received public benefits within their first five years in the United States as deportable.

Any alien who, in the opinion of the consular officer at the time of application for a visa, or in the opinion of the Attorney General at the time of application for admission or adjustment of status, is likely at any time to become a public charge is excludable.

These INA restrictions often affect decisions about visas and admission to the country, but rarely serve as a cause for deportation.

The Illegal Immigration Reform and Immigrant Responsibility Act of 1996 raised the standards for sponsors of immigrants, requiring them to show greater financial capacity and obligating them to reimburse the government for means-tested public benefits received by the immigrant they sponsor.

== Administrative implementation ==
Granting of visas to the United States is carried out by consular officials under the Department of State, while awarding immigration statuses such as Lawful Permanent Resident is done by the US Citizenship and Immigration Service (USCIS), and previous by the Immigration and Naturalization Service (INS). Charles Wheeler stated that prior to 1999, "DOS and INS officers exercised broad powers in interpreting this provision. Unfortunately, they sometimes applied different standards and imposed inconsistent requirements."

Historian Douglas Baynton writes that "The 'public charge' provision was intended to encompass people with disabilities more generally and was left to the examining officer's discretion."

=== 1999 Guidance ===
In May 1999, the Immigration and Nationalization Service issued formal guidance, "Field Guidance on Deportability and Inadmissibility on Public Charge Ground," defining a public charge as someone "primarily dependent on the government for subsistence, as demonstrated by either the receipt of public cash assistance for income maintenance, or institutionalization for long-term care at government expense." Examples of disqualifying assistance include Supplemental Security Income (SSI), cash assistance from the Temporary Assistance for Needy Families (TANF) program, and state or local cash assistance programs (often called "general assistance") for income maintenance. The guidance explicitly excluded Medicaid, food stamps, WIC, unemployment insurance, housing benefits, child care subsidies, or other non-cash benefits from qualifying immigrants as public charges.

=== 2019 Rule ===
On August 12, 2019, U.S. Citizenship and Immigration Services (USCIS) formally announced a new rule restricting poorer immigrants from attaining Lawful Permanent Resident status, popularly known as a Green Card. Under the rule, which took effect on October 15, 2019, legal immigrants who have received public benefits such as Supplemental Security Income, Temporary Assistance for Needy Families, the Supplemental Nutrition Assistance Program, Medicaid, and public housing assistance for more than a total of twelve months within any thirty-six month period may be classified as a "public charge" ineligible for permanent residency. Immigration officials may investigate the health, income, wealth, education, and family of applicants for permanent residency to predict whether they will become a public charge in the future. The term "public charge" appears in the Immigration and Nationality Act, but is not defined by the law. Refugees, asylum seekers, pregnant women, children, and family members of those serving in the Armed Forces are excluded from the restrictions. The Trump administration estimates that 58% of households headed by non-citizens use a public welfare program and half use Medicaid.

Ken Cuccinelli, the acting director of USCIS stated the policy will "have the long-term benefit of protecting taxpayers by ensuring people who are immigrating to this country don’t become public burdens, that they can stand on their own two feet, as immigrants in years past have done." The National Immigration Law Center stated that the rule "will have a dire humanitarian impact, forcing some families to forgo critical lifesaving health care and nutrition. The damage will be felt for decades to come." The law center announced it would sue to prevent the policy from taking effect. In January 2020, the US Supreme Court ruled that the Trump administration could begin enforcing the new rules while related lawsuits processed through the federal court system, and Citizenship and Immigration Services subsequently began enforcement of the public charge rule on February 24, 2020.

On July 29, 2020, the Southern District Court in New York enjoined the rule from being enforced during the COVID-19 pandemic, but the Second Circuit issued a partial stay on August 12 and a full stay on September 11.

On November 2, 2020, the Northern District Court in Illinois determined that the rule violated the Administrative Procedure Act, but the Seventh Circuit issued a stay the very next day, allowing the rule to continue to be enforced.

In March 2021, the 2019 public charge rule was repealed by the U.S. Citizenship and Immigration Service (USCIS). However, public charges remained, but would instead comply inadmissibility statute consistent with the USCIS 1999 Interim Field Guidance rule.

=== Conditions for denial ===
Individuals who have physical or mental ailments along with pregnant women are most likely to be proposed as a public charge. Immigrants who were found with physical or mental ailments were prospective for exclusion. Their ailments were seen to affect their ability to obtain employment and thus qualified them as a public charge.

Unmarried pregnant women seeking to migrate into the United States were presumed a public charge on account of their condition, both in the early twentieth and early twenty-first century. These women were excluded from entry and were barred from arriving into the United States. In recent years, pregnant Mexican women visiting United States doctors present doctor's notes confirming they have prepaid their bills in order to cross the border.

In addition, child-rearing amongst immigrant women is also presumptive causes of public charge. Although support for children was legal, undocumented women were denied legal citizenship due to the public assistance that their children received. In these cases and those of physical and mental ailments would render an obligation to government however, the government sought no obligation in this manner.

Immigrants who arrived with only twenty-five to forty dollars and with no source of employment were deemed liable to become a public charge. Immigrants were investigated through means of competent evidence.

Competent evidence includes the following;

- Health
- Family assets
- Financial status
- Education
- Skills
- Age

In the early 1900s, The Book of Instructions for the Medical Inspection of Immigrants listed pregnancy (regardless of marital status), and the sexually transmitted diseases syphilis and gonorrhea as grounds for exclusion.

Immigrants who had legally entered the United States but subsequently acquired any ailments that compromised their ability to earn a living were sought for deportation. These individuals had to leave within one year. Funds were distributed for their deportation by the Bureau of Immigration (Immigration Fund).

== Notable cases ==
=== Maria Gambacurta ===
In the early 1900s, Maria Gambacurta, a twenty-year-old immigrant from Italy who had recently given birth, along with her US citizen child, was deported because the hospital in which they were seeking care was supported through public funds.

=== Isabel Gonzalez (Gonzalez v. Williams) ===
Upon her arrival in New York City in 1902, Isabel Gonzalez was determined as liable to become a public charge as a young, pregnant, and single Puerto Rican immigrant. She was denied entry into the United States despite the arguments made on her behalf by a fiancé and family members. Nevertheless, Gonzalez was able to argue her case to the U.S. Supreme Court. Gonzalez did not argue her condition as likely to become a public charge; rather, she challenged the state of Puerto Rican immigrants in America claiming citizenship. It was found that she would be considered not an alien under immigration, but she would be determined a "non-citizen national".

== See also ==
- Immigration to the United States
- Welfare chauvinism
