= List of United States Supreme Court cases, volume 189 =

Supreme Court of the United States
- Interactive map of Supreme Court of the United States
- 38°53′26″N 77°00′16″W
- Established: March 4, 1789; 236 years ago
- Location: Washington, D.C.
- Coordinates: 38°53′26″N 77°00′16″W
- Composition method: Presidential nomination with Senate confirmation
- Authorised by: Constitution of the United States, Art. III, § 1
- Judge term length: life tenure, subject to impeachment and removal
- Number of positions: 9 (by statute)
- Website: supremecourt.gov

This is a list of cases reported in volume 189 of United States Reports, decided by the Supreme Court of the United States in 1903.

== Justices of the Supreme Court at the time of volume 189 U.S. ==
The Supreme Court is established by Article III, Section 1 of the Constitution of the United States, which says: "The judicial Power of the United States, shall be vested in one supreme Court . . .". The size of the Court is not specified; the Constitution leaves it to Congress to set the number of justices. Under the Judiciary Act of 1789 Congress originally fixed the number of justices at six (one chief justice and five associate justices). Since 1789 Congress has varied the size of the Court from six to seven, nine, ten, and back to nine justices (always including one chief justice).

When the cases in volume 189 were decided the Court comprised the following nine members:

Portrait	Justice	Office	Home State	Succeeded	Date confirmed by the Senate (Vote)	Tenure on Supreme Court
	Melville Fuller	Chief Justice	Illinois	Morrison Waite	July 20, 1888 (41–20)	October 8, 1888 – July 4, 1910 (Died)
	John Marshall Harlan	Associate Justice	Kentucky	David Davis	November 29, 1877 (Acclamation)	December 10, 1877 – October 14, 1911 (Died)
	David Josiah Brewer	Associate Justice	Kansas	Stanley Matthews	December 18, 1889 (53–11)	January 6, 1890 – March 28, 1910 (Died)
	Henry Billings Brown	Associate Justice	Michigan	Samuel Freeman Miller	December 29, 1890 (Acclamation)	January 5, 1891 – May 28, 1906 (Retired)
	Edward Douglass White	Associate Justice	Louisiana	Samuel Blatchford	February 19, 1894 (Acclamation)	March 12, 1894 – December 18, 1910 (Continued as chief justice)
	Rufus W. Peckham	Associate Justice	New York	Howell Edmunds Jackson	December 9, 1895 (Acclamation)	January 6, 1896 – October 24, 1909 (Died)
	Joseph McKenna	Associate Justice	California	Stephen Johnson Field	January 21, 1898 (Acclamation)	January 26, 1898 – January 5, 1925 (Retired)
	Oliver Wendell Holmes Jr.	Associate Justice	Massachusetts	Horace Gray	December 4, 1902 (Acclamation)	December 8, 1902 – January 12, 1932 (Retired)
	William R. Day	Associate Justice	Ohio	George Shiras Jr.	February 23, 1903 (Acclamation)	March 2, 1903 – November 13, 1922 (Retired)

== Citation style ==
Under the Judiciary Act of 1789 the federal court structure at the time comprised District Courts, which had general trial jurisdiction; Circuit Courts, which had mixed trial and appellate (from the US District Courts) jurisdiction; and the United States Supreme Court, which had appellate jurisdiction over the federal District and Circuit courts—and for certain issues over state courts. The Supreme Court also had limited original jurisdiction (i.e., in which cases could be filed directly with the Supreme Court without first having been heard by a lower federal or state court). There were one or more federal District Courts and/or Circuit Courts in each state, territory, or other geographical region.

The Judiciary Act of 1891 created the United States Courts of Appeals and reassigned the jurisdiction of most routine appeals from the district and circuit courts to these appellate courts. The Act created nine new courts that were originally known as the "United States Circuit Courts of Appeals." The new courts had jurisdiction over most appeals of lower court decisions. The Supreme Court could review either legal issues that a court of appeals certified or decisions of court of appeals by writ of certiorari.

Bluebook citation style is used for case names, citations, and jurisdictions.

- "# Cir." = United States Court of Appeals
  - e.g., "3d Cir." = United States Court of Appeals for the Third Circuit
- "C.C.D." = United States Circuit Court for the District of . . .
  - e.g.,"C.C.D.N.J." = United States Circuit Court for the District of New Jersey
- "D." = United States District Court for the District of . . .
  - e.g.,"D. Mass." = United States District Court for the District of Massachusetts
- "E." = Eastern; "M." = Middle; "N." = Northern; "S." = Southern; "W." = Western
  - e.g.,"C.C.S.D.N.Y." = United States Circuit Court for the Southern District of New York
  - e.g.,"M.D. Ala." = United States District Court for the Middle District of Alabama
- "Ct. Cl." = United States Court of Claims
- The abbreviation of a state's name alone indicates the highest appellate court in that state's judiciary at the time.
  - e.g.,"Pa." = Supreme Court of Pennsylvania
  - e.g.,"Me." = Supreme Judicial Court of Maine

== List of cases in volume 189 U.S. ==
Case Name	Page & year	Opinion of the Court	Concurring opinion(s)	Dissenting opinion(s)	Lower Court	Disposition of case
Kennedy M. & M. Co. v. Argonaut M. Co.	1 (1903)	Fuller	none	none	Cal.	affirmed
Kokomo F.M. Co. v. Kitselman	8 (1903)	Fuller	none	none	7th Cir.	reversed
Hennessy v. Richardson D. Co.	25 (1903)	Fuller	none	none	C.C.D. Neb.	reversed
Kirwan v. Murphy	35 (1903)	Fuller	none	none	8th Cir.	reversed
Brill v. Peckham et al. Co.	57 (1903)	Fuller	none	none	2d Cir.	reversed
Tennessee v. Condon	64 (1903)	Fuller	none	none	Tenn.	dismissed
Union & P. Bank v. City of Memphis	71 (1903)	Fuller	none	none	multiple	multiple
Mexican C. Ry. Co., Ltd. v. Duthie	76 (1903)	Fuller	none	none	C.C.W.D. Tex.	affirmed
Jaquith v. Alden	78 (1903)	Fuller	none	none	1st Cir.	affirmed
In re Key	84 (1903)	Fuller	none	none	D.C. Cir.	mandamus denied
Japanese Imm. Case	86 (1903)	Harlan	none	none	C.C.D. Wash.	affirmed
Oregon and California Railroad Co. v. United States I	103 (1903)	Harlan	none	none	9th Cir.	affirmed
Oregon and California Railroad Co. v. United States II	116 (1903)	Harlan	none	none	9th Cir.	affirmed
De Cambra v. Rogers	119 (1903)	Brewer	none	none	Cal.	affirmed
Eastern et al. Ass'n v. Williamson	122 (1903)	Brewer	none	none	S.C.	affirmed
Bell v. Commonwealth et al. Co.	131 (1903)	Brewer	none	none	3d Cir.	affirmed
Fidelity & D. Co. v. Bucki & Son L. Co.	135 (1903)	Brewer	none	none	5th Cir.	affirmed
McClung v. Penny	143 (1903)	Brewer	none	none	Sup. Ct. Terr. Okla.	dismissed
Winebrenner v. Forney	148 (1903)	Brewer	none	none	Sup. Ct. Terr. Okla.	dismissed
Sawyer v. Piper	154 (1903)	Brewer	none	none	Minn.	dismissed
The Osceola	158 (1903)	Brown	none	none	7th Cir.	certification
San Jose et al. Co. v. San Jose R. Co.	177 (1903)	Brown	none	none	Cal.	affirmed
The Roanoke	185 (1903)	Brown	none	none	D. Wash.	reversed
United States v. Nix	199 (1903)	Brown	none	none	Ct. Cl.	reversed
Davis & F. Mfg. Co. v. City of Los Angeles	207 (1903)	Brown	none	none	C.C.S.D. Cal.	affirmed
Nashua S. Bank v. Anglo et al. Co.	221 (1903)	Brown	none	none	1st Cir.	affirmed
Sena v. United States I	233 (1903)	Brown	none	none	Ct. Priv. Land Cl.	affirmed
Rankin v. Fidelity et al. Co.	242 (1903)	Brown	none	none	3d Cir.	affirmed
Glidden v. Harrington	255 (1903)	Brown	none	none	Mass. Super. Ct.	affirmed
Wiser v. Lawler	260 (1903)	Brown	none	none	Sup. Ct. Terr. Ariz.	affirmed
Missouri P. Ry. Co. v. United States	274 (1903)	White	none	Brewer	8th Cir.	reversed
Potter v. Hall	292 (1903)	White	none	none	Sup. Ct. Terr. Okla.	reversed
Farmers' & M. Ins. Co. v. Dobney	301 (1903)	White	none	none	Neb.	affirmed
Onondaga Nation v. Thacher	306 (1903)	White	none	none	N.Y. Sup. Ct.	dismissed
Shurtleff v. United States	311 (1903)	Peckham	none	none	Ct. Cl.	affirmed
Sexton v. California	319 (1903)	Peckham	none	none	Cal.	affirmed
Foster v. Pryor	325 (1903)	Peckham	none	none	Sup. Ct. Terr. Okla.	affirmed
Finney v. Guy	335 (1903)	Peckham	none	none	Wis.	affirmed
Thayer v. Spratt	346 (1903)	Peckham	none	none	Wash.	affirmed
Texas P. Ry. Co. v. Carlin	354 (1903)	Peckham	none	none	5th Cir.	affirmed
The Conemaugh	363 (1903)	McKenna	none	none	6th Cir.	affirmed
Zane v. Hamilton Cnty.	370 (1903)	McKenna	none	none	7th Cir.	affirmed
Detroit et al. Ry. v. Osborn	383 (1903)	McKenna	none	none	Mich.	affirmed
United States v. Mission R. Co.	391 (1903)	McKenna	none	none	9th Cir.	affirmed
Chattanooga et al. Ass'n v. Denson	408 (1903)	McKenna	none	none	5th Cir.	affirmed
Gordon ex rel. Roper v. Randle	417 (1903)	McKenna	none	none	D.C. Cir.	affirmed
Pullman Co. v. Adams	420 (1903)	Holmes	none	none	Miss.	affirmed
National B. & L. Co. v. Petrie	423 (1903)	Holmes	none	none	N.Y. Sup. Ct.	affirmed
Brownfield v. South Carolina	426 (1903)	Holmes	none	none	S.C.	affirmed
Pardee v. Aldridge	429 (1903)	Holmes	none	none	Tex. Civ. App.	affirmed
Knoxville W. Co. v. City of Knoxville	434 (1903)	Holmes	none	none	Tenn.	affirmed
San Diego L.T. Co. v. Jasper	439 (1903)	Holmes	none	none	C.C.S.D. Cal.	affirmed
Southern P.R.R. Co. v. United States	447 (1903)	Holmes	none	none	9th Cir.	affirmed
The Paquete Habana	453 (1903)	Holmes	none	none	S.D. Fla.	reversed
Texas P. Ry. Co. v. Behymer	468 (1903)	Holmes	none	none	5th Cir.	affirmed
United States v. Sweet	471 (1903)	Holmes	none	none	Ct. Cl.	reversed
United States v. Barnett	474 (1903)	Holmes	none	none	Ct. Cl.	reversed
Giles v. Harris	475 (1903)	Holmes	none	Brewer; Harlan	C.C.M.D. Ala.	affirmed
Sena v. United States II	504 (1903)	Brown	none	none	Ct. Priv. Land Cl.	affirmance modified

== See also ==
- Certificate of division
