= Sir William Williams =

Sir William Williams may refer to:

- Sir William Williams, 1st Baronet, of Tregullow (1791-1870), see Williams family of Caerhays and Burncoose
- Sir William Williams, 1st Baronet, of Gray's Inn (1634-1700), Welsh lawyer and politician, speaker of the House of Commons
- Sir William Williams, 1st Baronet, of Kars (1800–1883), British military leader of the Victorian era, Member of Parliament for Calne (1856–1859)
- Sir William Williams, 2nd Baronet, of Clapton (c. 1730–1761) Member of Parliament for New Shoreham (1758–1761)
- Sir William Williams, 2nd Baronet, of Gray's Inn (c. 1665–1740), Welsh politician, Member of Parliament for Denbigh (1708–1710)
- Sir William Emrys Williams (1896–1977), British educationalist and Editor-in-Chief of Penguin Books, 1936–1965
- Sir Thomas Williams (Warrington MP) (1915–1986), British Labour Co-operative politician, Member of Parliament for Hammersmith South, Barons Court and Warrington (1949–1981)

== See also ==
- Williams baronets
- William Williams (disambiguation)
- Sir William Williams, 1st Baronet (disambiguation)
