= Market facilitation index =

The Market Facilitation Index (MFI) is the creation of Bill Williams. The indicator endeavors to establish the effectiveness of price movement by computing the price movement per volume unit. This is accomplished by subtracting the day's low from the high and dividing the result by the total volume. (See below)

A	B	C	D	E	F
Date	High	Low	Volume	B minus C	E/D
20/10/10	11.3700	10.3640	10,000	1.0060	0.0001006
21/10/10	11.3690	10.3650	9,156	1.0040	0.0001096
22/10/10	11.3740	10.3680	12,487	1.0060	0.0000805
23/10/10	11.3770	10.3690	13,291	1.0080	0.0000758
24/10/10	11.3750	10.3660	15,349	1.0090	0.0000657

== Analysis ==
As an indicator on its own the MFI is of no significant value. Nonetheless, if the current price candle's MFI and volume are compared to the previous candle's MFI and volume, the index starts to have some significant tradable data.

The four possible groupings of MFI and volume were termed Green, Fade, Fake and Squat by Williams.

MFI	Volume	Terms
+	+	Green
-	-	Fade
+	-	Fake
-	+	Squat

Green: The MFI increases and the volume increases. This means that the number of participants entering the market increases, therefore the volume increases and the fresh incoming players align their positions in the direction of candlestick growth. Notice the long solid candles in the candlestick chart which indicates that the trend has begun and is picking up speed.

Fade: The MFI falls and volume falls. It means that the market participants are indifferent and the price movement is small on small volumes. This usually happens at the end of a trend. (See candlestick chart)

Fake: The MFI increases, but the volume falls. It is highly likely that the market is being supported by broker speculation and not any significant client volume.

Squat: The MFI falls, but the volume increases. In this particular situation bulls and bears are fighting between themselves to see who will dominate the next trend. These battles are noticeable by the large sell and buy volumes. However, the price does not change appreciably since the strengths are equal. One of the competing parties either the buyers or the sellers will ultimately triumph in the battle. Usually, the fracture of a candle at such a point indicates either the continuation or termination of the trend.
