= William B. Williams (Mississippi politician) =

American politician

William B. Williams was a state legislator in Mississippi. He represented Holmes County, Mississippi in the Mississippi House of Representatives in 1870 and 1871. He was a Republican.

He served with fellow Holmes County representatives Cicero Mitchell and Edmond Scarborough.
