= Giles v. Harris =

- Supreme Court of the United States

Submitted February 24, 1903 Decided April 27, 1903
- Full case name: Jackson W. Giles, Appellant v. E. Jeff Harris, William A. Gunter, Jr., and Charles B. Teasley, Board of Registrars of Montgomery County, Alabama
- Citations: 189 U.S. 475 (more) 23 S. Ct. 639; 47 L. Ed. 909; 1903 U.S. LEXIS 1378

Case history
- Prior: Appeal from the Circuit Court of the United States for the Middle District of Alabama

Holding
- The Court refused to assist African Americans in Alabama who were being systematically denied the right to vote by a scheme set up by the all-white state legislature.

Court membership
- Chief Justice Melville Fuller Associate Justices John M. Harlan · David J. Brewer; Henry B. Brown · Edward D. White; Rufus W. Peckham · Joseph McKenna; Oliver W. Holmes Jr. · William R. Day

Case opinions
- Majority: Holmes, joined by Fuller, White, Peckham, McKenna, Day
- Dissent: Brewer, joined by Brown
- Dissent: Harlan

Laws applied
- U.S. Const., Amendments XI & XV
- Superseded by
- Voting Rights Act of 1965

Giles v. Harris, 189 U.S. 475 (1903), was an early 20th-century United States Supreme Court case in which the Court upheld a state constitution's requirements for voter registration and qualifications. Although the plaintiff accused the state of discriminating in practice against black citizens, the Court found that the requirements applied to all citizens and refused to review the results "in practice," which it considered overseeing the state's process. As there was no stated intent in law to disenfranchise blacks, the Court upheld the state law.

The African-American educator Booker T. Washington secretly arranged for funding and representation for Jackson W. Giles in this lawsuit and the ensuing Giles v. Teasley (1904). He worked extensively behind the scenes to direct and raise funds for other lawsuits and segregation challenges as well.

== Background ==
The plaintiff, Jackson W. Giles, sued on behalf of more than 5,000 black citizens of Montgomery, Alabama, such as himself in seeking to have the federal court require the state to register them to vote. The suit was brought in response to a number of provisions in the Alabama state constitution, which combined to prevent blacks from being able to register. Giles was literate and had voted in Montgomery for 30 years, from 1871 to 1901, before the new constitution was passed.

One of the new provisions held that any person registered before January 1, 1903, as most whites were, would thereafter be registered for life. That was a type of grandfather clause. Any person not registered at that time, as most blacks were not, would have to satisfy a number of requirements before being allowed to register. This gave local officials authority to bar voters. They included a test of the potential registrant's understanding of the duties and obligations of citizenship. This test was administered by white election officials, who conducted it in a subjective manner that resulted in most whites being approved to register and most blacks being rejected.

The district court dismissed the case on the grounds that the suit was not seeking enough in damages to bring it within the jurisdiction of the federal courts. At the time, a statute was in place requiring that cases brought under federal question jurisdiction satisfy an amount-in-controversy requirement of $2,000. Giles had not specified any amount of monetary damages. The plaintiff appealed the dismissal to the Supreme Court. He appealed against the decision.

== Issue ==
Did federal courts have the authority to hear a case brought against state government officials based on the assertion that those officials were part of a statewide conspiracy to deprive blacks of the right to vote?

== Decision ==
The Supreme Court, in an opinion written by Justice Oliver Wendell Holmes Jr., decided to uphold the dismissal of the case, for two reasons:

- First, the Court noted that the plaintiffs were asserting that the entire registration system was unconstitutional, but the only relief they sought was to be registered. The Court suggested that it could not order the names of the plaintiffs to be added to the voter rolls, while the entire voting process remained illegal, since doing so would make the court complicit in an illegal scheme.
- Second, the Court noted that under the doctrine set forth in Hans v. Louisiana (1890), the Eleventh Amendment prohibited the plaintiff from suing the state directly in a United States federal court. Since the federal court has no power to issue an order to the state, the only way that the plaintiff's ability to vote could be enforced would be for the court to monitor the entire election process, which would be beyond the court's actual power, in light of the overwhelming desire of the white population to prevent blacks from voting. Only Congress and the federal government possess, according to the court, the actual powers that would be needed to force the state to comply against the wishes of its population.

The majority opinion suggests that it is quite possible that the registration and voting system in Alabama is, in fact, unconstitutional as alleged, but no decision was taken on that question because of the two objections described above.

=== Dissenting opinions ===
Justice John Marshall Harlan and Justice David Josiah Brewer both dissented from the Court's opinion. Harlan contended that the court could have resolved the issue based on the amount-in-controversy requirement and did not need to address the power of the federal courts to hear the merits of this suit. Harlan and Brewer both asserted that if the question was solely one of the power of federal courts to hear the case, the Court should find that such power exists.

== Aftermath ==
In Giles v. Teasley, Jackson Giles sought to meet some of the Court's grounds for its rulings, but his challenge was rejected. It was not until many years later that the Court overturned Giles v. Harris in a series of cases: they established that the right to vote was protected by the Equal Protection Clause of the Fourteenth Amendment, and federal courts have broad power to address deprivations of constitutional rights of citizens within states. After congressional passage of the Voting Rights Act of 1965, the federal government was authorized to oversee, monitor and enforce voter registration and elections to ensure that African Americans (and other minorities) were allowed to register and vote. It still took years and more court cases to achieve.

When Giles v. Harris was brought to the Supreme Court, some members of the Court (and the Executive Branch) did not conceive of exercising such federal powers years after Reconstruction had ended. However, the legislative branch had exercised such power in challenges until the time of Giles v. Harris. In the 19th century, the House Elections Committee repeatedly refused to seat members reported elected by their states when it found that the voting or registration process had been compromised. Since the excluded members were inevitably Democrats, partisan politics could play a role in these decisions; certainly such members were unseated only when Republicans held the majority in the House. After the Giles v. Harris ruling, the legislative branch stopped unseating members because of such concerns. The issue of disenfranchisement of blacks was repeatedly brought up by concerned congressmen. For instance, in the 1920s, a Republican representative proposed readjusting apportionment to decrease southern seats in relation to the populations they had disfranchised. By that time, the Southern Democrats had so much power that they could defeat any such proposals.

Despite his legal setbacks, Jackson Giles attempted to vote in the November 1904 elections in Montgomery. Registrars refused to allow him to cast a ballot. In 1907, Giles moved to Taft, Oklahoma, where he remained politically active through the 1920s. He died in 1943.
