= William Williams (Archdeacon of Cashel) =

Irish Anglican clergyman

William Williams was a 17th-century Anglican clergyman.

Dassy was born in Mona, Anglesey and educated at Trinity College Dublin. He was Archdeacon of Cashel from 1692 until 1693.
