= Gertrude Rosenblum Williams =

British economist and social strategist

- Born: 1897
- Died: 1983 (aged 85–86)
- Occupation: Economist

Gertrude Rosenblum, Lady Williams CBE (1897–1983) was an economist and social strategist whose research and writing impacted on the foundation and development of the Welfare State in the United Kingdom from the 1940s. She is considered amongst the earliest women economic historians. Williams was Professor of Social Economics and later Professor Emeritus of Social Economics at the University of London. Much of Williams' work related to labour supply and industrial relations although she also published on changing attitudes to women in the work place. Williams published under married name of Gertrude Williams and was married to William Emrys Williams.

== Career ==
Williams obtained a B.A. degree from the University of Manchester and published prolifically across her forty-year career from 1923 to the mid-1960s. One of Williams' earliest publication appears to be Social Aspects of Industrial Problems, published in 1923 when Williams was Lecturer in the Department of Social Studies, Bedford College for Women, University of London. This was followed four years later by A Synopsis of Economics published by Methuen in 1927 with a second edition published in 1945. There was nearly a decade-long gap between Williams' 1927 book and the publication of The State and the Standard of Living, published by P.S. King in 1936.

In 1944, Williams authored The Price of Social Security. A year later in 1945, Williams authored Women and Work, in which she argued that the desire for increased opportunities for women in the workplace was ill-met by the supply: women's work, Williams described, was like a "bottle-neck into which a flood tries to pour itself." Women and Work was published as part of the New Democracy series which contained 13 pictorial charts (now infographics) produced by Otto Neurath's Isotype Institute to make the statistics she provided more intelligible. Williams’ social mapping sits in a tradition begun by Charles Booth and Beatrice Webb. Women and Work was well received: a review in The Woman Engineer concluded that "it is only through widespread and intelligent discussion fostered by such books as this that the general attitude to women and work can be changed."

After the war, Williams continued publishing in this vein: in 1950 she published The economics of everyday life, which had numerous editions published subsequently. In 1957, Williams published Recruitment to skilled trades. In 1963, Williams published her 'classic' study, Apprenticeship in Europe : the lesson for Britain. Williams' publications tailed off in the late 1960s with two publications: a short pamphlet on The changing pattern of women's employment published by Liverpool University Press in 1965. In 1967, Williams published The Coming of the Welfare State and contributed the "Williams Report" 'Caring for people' through her role on the Committee of Enquiry into the staffing of residential homes.

== Personal life ==
Born in 1897, Williams married educator and publisher William Emrys Williams in 1919 and they had no children. Their marriage was described as "affectionate and mutually supportive" and was recorded as such in Williams's biography of her husband, W.E. Williams: Educator Extraordinary (2000), published after both their deaths. However, their relationship was complicated by her husband's fifteen-year passionate relationship with Estrid Bannister as well as his ambiguous relationship with his secretary, Joy Lyons. Williams died in 1983.

== Select Bibliography ==
- Social Aspects of Industrial Problems. London: P.S. King & Son, Ltd, 1923.
- A Synopsis of Economics. London: Methuen, 1927.
- The State and the Standard of Living. London: P.S. King & Son Ltd, 1936.
- The Price of Social Security. London: Kegan Paul, Trench, Trubner and Co., 1944.
- Women and Work. London: Nicholson and Watson, 1945.
- A Synopsis of Economics (2nd edition). London: Methuen, 1945.
- The economics of everyday life. Harmondsworth: Penguin, 1950.
- Recruitment to skilled trades. London: Routledge & Kegan Paul, 1957.
- Apprenticeship in Europe : the lesson for Britain. London, Chapman & Hall, 1963.
- The changing pattern of women's employment. Liverpool: Liverpool University Press, 1965.
- The Coming of the Welfare State. London: 1967.
- Caring for people : staffing residential homes. London: Allen & Unwin, 1967.
- W.E. Williams: Educator Extraordinary. London: Penguin Collectors' Society, 2000.
