= Willie Williams =

Willie Williams may refer to:

== Sports ==
=== American football ===
- Willie Williams (cornerback, born 1941), American NFL football player for the New York Giants and Oakland Raiders
- Willie Williams (offensive tackle) (born 1967), American NFL football player the Phoenix Cardinals and New Orleans Saints
- Willie Williams (cornerback, born 1970), American NFL football player for the Pittsburgh Steelers and Seattle Seahawks
- Willie Williams (defensive tackle) (born 1984), American NFL football player for the St. Louis Rams and Philadelphia Eagles

=== Other sports ===
- Willie Williams (baseball) (1925–2011), American baseball player
- Willie Williams (sprinter) (1931–2019), American sprinter
- Willie Williams II (1940–1982), American sprinter, 1960 All-American for the San Jose State Spartans track and field team
- Willie Williams (cricketer) (born 1941), English cricketer
- Willie Williams (basketball) (born 1946), American basketball player
- Willie Williams (karateka) (1951–2019), American karateka and mixed martial artist

== Others ==
- James E. Williams (Willie Williams, 1930–1999), United States Navy sailor awarded the Medal of Honor
- Willie L. Williams (1943–2016), American police officer, Los Angeles police chief
- Willie Williams (general) (born 1951), American Marine Corps general
- Willie Williams (murderer) (1956–2005), American murderer
- Willie Williams (set designer) (born 1959), British theatrical stage set, lighting designer and video director
- Willi Williams (fl. 1960s–present), Jamaican reggae and dub singer

== See also ==
- William Williams (disambiguation)
