= William Williams (footballer, born 1892) =

English footballer (1892–1926)

Personal information
- Full name: William David Williams
- Date of birth: 16 November 1892
- Place of birth: Salford, England
- Date of death: 1926 (aged 33–34)
- Place of death: Blackburn, England
- Position: Inside forward

Senior career*
Years	Team	Apps	(Gls)
1921–1922	Darwen		
1922–1925	Everton	39	(14)
1925–1926	Blackpool	22	(9)
Total		61	(23)
- * Club domestic league appearances and goals

William David Williams (16 November 1892 – 1926) was an English footballer who played in the Football League for Blackpool and Everton. Williams died in 1926 of meningitis.
