= Immigration Act of 1891 =

United States law

- Long title: An Act in amendment to the various acts relative to immigration and the importation of aliens under contract or agreement to perform labor.
- Enacted by: the 51st United States Congress
- Effective: March 3, 1891

Citations
- Public law: 51-551
- Statutes at Large: 26 Stat. 1084a

Legislative history
- Introduced in the House as H.R. 13586; Signed into law by President Benjamin Harrison on March 3, 1891

The Immigration Act of 1891, also known as the 1891 Immigration Act, was a modification of the Immigration Act of 1882, focusing on immigration rules and enforcement mechanisms for foreigners arriving from countries other than China. It was the second major federal legislation related to the mechanisms and authority of immigration enforcement, the first being the Immigration Act of 1882 (there were other, more minor pieces of legislation passed in the 1880s). The law was passed on March 3, 1891, at the end of the term of the 51st United States Congress, and signed into law by then United States president Benjamin Harrison.

== Historical context ==
=== Immigration Act of 1882 ===
The Immigration Act of 1882 was the first major federal legislation describing a framework for regulation of immigration. The Act allowed for head taxes on certain arriving migrants, and allowed the use of this to fund a federal immigration bureaucracy.

=== Related legislation on Chinese exclusion ===
A parallel set of legislative, executive, and judicial changes was unfolding in the domain of Chinese exclusion. The key pieces of legislation were:

- The Page Act of 1875, that banned forced laborers and women suspected of prostitution from Asia
- Angell Treaty of 1880 placed a moratorium on migration from China, amending the Burlingame Treaty
- Chinese Exclusion Act (1882), banning for ten years the migration of Chinese skilled and unskilled laborers.
- Scott Act (1888), amending the Chinese Exclusion Act to also ban the re-entry of Chinese laborers who had already been living in the United States.
- Geary Act (1892), extending the Chinese Exclusion Act for another ten years, and also requiring certificates of residence from existing Chinese to prove that they had entered lawfully (i.e., prior to the Chinese Exclusion Act). Those without certificates of residence could be deported.

== Provisions ==
=== New border procedures and extended authority to land borders ===
The Act specified that the officers in charge of any vessel arriving by sea had to submit a list of passengers with their biographical information to the immigration inspectors at the port. Requirements of this sort had been part of United States federal law since the requirement for a manifest of immigrants in Section 4 of the Steerage Act of 1819. However, in this case the list needed to be submitted immediately upon arrival and was used to inspect aliens prior to admitting them. The inspectors at ports of entry had the authority to conduct a medical examination of aliens suspected of being unfit or having dangerous diseases, marking the beginning of medical exclusion of immigrants in the United States. Aliens who were detained for a medical examination were still considered to not have formally entered the United States.

Whereas the Immigration Act of 1882 had only regulated the coastal borders of the United States, the Immigration Act of 1891 extended this authority to land borders with Canada and Mexico. It directed the Secretary of the Treasury to prescribe rules for the enforcement along land borders that would balance the interests of immigration law enforcement with the goal to not obstruct or unnecessarily delay, impede, or annoy passengers in ordinary travel between the countries.

=== Authority to deport ===
An Act of October 19, 1888 had established the authority to remove migrants who should not have been allowed to enter for up to one year after their arrival. The Immigration Act of 1891 reiterated the authority to remove aliens. The following two provisions were relevant:

- Section 10 specified that an alien may be required to depart by the same vessel used for arrival, and the captain or master of the ship was required to cooperate, with a minimum fine of $300 for non-cooperation and no permission for departure if a ship had unpaid fines.
- Section 11 allowed for the deportation of any aliens who had arrived in violation of the laws (i.e., if the alien was in one of the excludable categories) at the expense of whoever facilitated the alien's entry.

=== Penalties and restrictions on abetting migration ===
In addition to Sections 10 and 11, that pushed the financial responsibility for deporting an alien onto the vessel or persons who had brought the alien in, other provisions aimed to penalize the abetting of migration. Sections 3 and 4 forbade advertising journeys to migrants as a way of getting jobs, updating the Alien Contract Labor Law. Section 5 exempted ministers, professors, and others in skilled professions, as well as relatives of United States citizens, from the provisions of Sections 3 and 4.

== Subsequent events ==
=== Court challenges ===
The first challenge to the Act was Nishimura Ekiu v. United States. Nishimura Ekiu, a female citizen of Japan, arrived at the United States from Yokohama, Japan, on May 7, 1891, and was denied entry under the Immigration Act of 1891. She sued for habeas corpus, and challenged the constitutionality of some provisions of the Immigration Act of 1891. The case was decided against Ekiu and in favor of the United States.

A later case, Yamataya v. Fisher (also known as the Japanese Immigrant Case) challenged the constitutionality of the provisions to exclude and deport immigrants, arguing that these provisions violated the Due Process Clause of the United States Constitution. This was the first time the Supreme Court allowed judicial review of a procedural due process claim. The case was decided against the Japanese petitioner Yamataya, and found Yamataya to be deportable.

=== Opening of Ellis Island ===
Ellis Island, an immigrant inspection station in Upper New York Bay (near New York City) on the East Coast of the United States opened on January 2, 1892, shortly after the passage of the Immigration Act of 1891. It would be the busiest immigration inspection. Immigrant inspection at Ellis Island was carried out as per the specifications of the Immigration Act of 1891. The medical examination to determine medical excludability (as described in Section 1 of the Act) and detention of migrants with medical conditions were carried out at the Ellis Island Immigrant Hospital located in the south side of the island.

=== Changes to structure of immigration bureaucracy ===
A congressional act of March 2, 1895 renamed the Office of Immigration as the Bureau of Immigration and changed the title of superintendent of immigration to commissioner-general of immigration.

== See also ==
- Nishimura Ekiu v. United States: Supreme Court reviewing the act
- Yamataya v. Fisher: Supreme Court reviewing the act
- Immigration Act of 1882
