= William J. Williams =

William J. Williams may refer to:

- William Joseph Williams (1759–1823), American painter
- William John Williams (born 1960), English footballer and sports commentator
- William J. McWilliams, from Secretary of State of Maryland in 1956
- William J. Williams, elected in the Alberta general election, 1944 under the Veterans' and Active Force party banner

== See also ==
- William Williams (disambiguation)
