= Billy Williams (rugby union, born 1921) =

- Full name: William Arthur Williams
- Born: 9 September 1921 Talywain, Wales
- Died: 2 August 2002 (aged 80) Newport, Wales

Rugby union career
- Position: Scrum-half
International career
Years	Team	Apps	(Points)
1952–53	Wales	3	(0)

William Arthur Williams (9 September 1921 — 2 August 2002) was a Welsh international rugby union player.

A lorry driver from Talywain, Williams was a scrum-half and captained his local club Talywain RFC, prior to his recruitment in 1949–50 by Newport RFC, which were seeking a replacement for Haydn Thomas.

Williams was called up by Wales to deputise an injured Rex Willis for the final two matches of their 1952 Five Nations campaign, with the team in contention for the grand slam. With Williams and Cliff Morgan as half-back partners, Wales won both remaining matches, against Ireland at Lansdowne Road and France at Swansea, to claim their fifth grand slam.

== See also ==
- List of Wales national rugby union players
