= Bill Williams (trader) =

American trader and author (1932–2019)

Bill M. Williams (1932–2019) was an American trader and author of books on trading psychology, technical analysis, and chaos theory in trading the stock, commodity, and foreign exchange (Forex) markets. His study of stock market data led him to develop a number of technical analysis techniques that identify trends in the financial markets. Indicators like Accelerator/Decelerator Oscillator, Alligator indicator, Awesome Oscillator, Fractals indicator, Gator Oscillator, and Market facilitation index are popular today in financial markets.
