= Gertrude Marvin Williams =

American biographer and journalist

signature

Gertrude Marvin Williams (July 10, 1884 – April 16, 1974) was an American biographer and journalist.

== Biography ==
Williams was born Gertrude Leavenworth Marvin on July 10, 1884. Her parents were Rev. Walter Marvin and Grace Marvin.

Williams graduated from Wellesley College (1907) and received a master's degree from the University of Pennsylvania (1937). She worked as a reporter for The New York Evening Sun.

She is best known for her critical biographies of Annie Besant and Helena Blavatsky which have received positive reviews. According to a review of the book, Williams revealed that Blavatsky was a fraud and her "charlatanry was of the crudest variety".

== Understanding India ==
Williams travelled over 6,000 miles in India for five months in 1928. She travelled by herself without servants, spending time in homes, markets and villages. She interviewed Mahatma Gandhi and other Indian nationalists and spent time with people from different social classes. She described her observations in her book Understanding India (1928).

Gandhi suggested the book would "help in many ways to correct the wrong impressions which Miss Mayo has given."

== Publications ==
- India's Silent Revolution (1919) [with Fred Bohn Fisher]
- Understanding India (1928)
- The Passionate Pilgrim: A Life of Annie Besant (1931)
- Madame Blavatsky: Priestess of the Occult (1946)
