= William Thomas Williams =

William Thomas Williams may refer to:

- Thomas Williams (Warrington MP) (1915–1986), British Labour Co-operative politician
- William T. Williams (born 1942), American painter
- W. T. Williams (1913–1995), English and Australian botanist and plant taxonomist

== See also ==
- William Williams (disambiguation)
- Thomas Williams (disambiguation)
