= Billy Williams (Seattle Pilots outfielder) =

American baseball player (1932-2013)

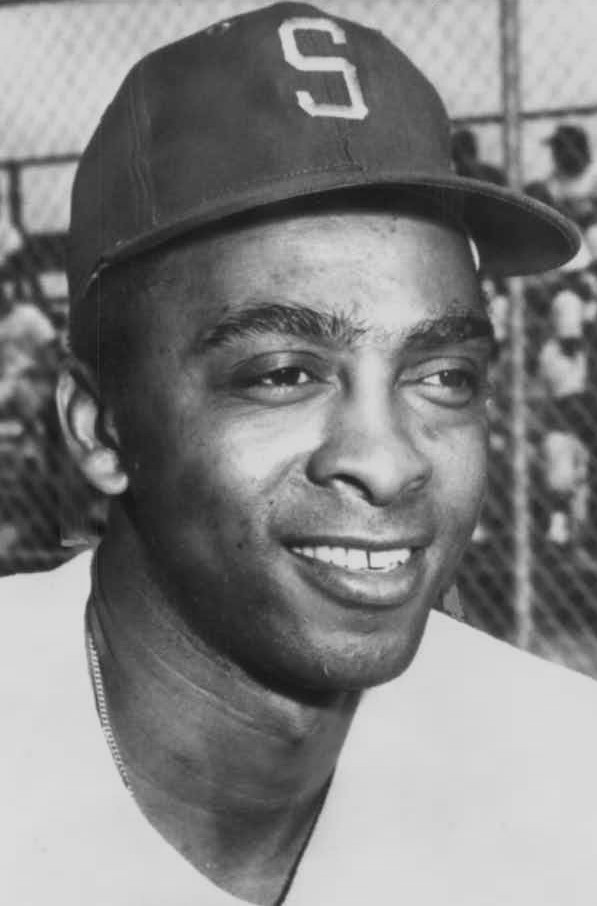
- Right fielder
- Born: June 13, 1932; Newberry, South Carolina, U.S.
- Died: June 11, 2013 (aged 80); Oakland, California, U.S.
- Batted: Left Threw: Right

MLB debut
- August 15, 1969, for the Seattle Pilots

Last MLB appearance
- August 20, 1969, for the Seattle Pilots

MLB statistics
- Batting average: .000
- At bats: 10
- Runs batted in: 0
- Stats at Baseball Reference

Teams
- Seattle Pilots (1969)

William Williams (June 13, 1932 – June 11, 2013) was an American professional baseball player. He appeared in four Major League Baseball (MLB) games for the 1969 Seattle Pilots. Williams also had an extensive minor league baseball playing career, spanning eighteen seasons from 1952 to 1969.

== Playing career ==
After spending two seasons with the independent Norton Braves of the Mountain State League, Williams signed with the Cleveland Indians as an amateur free agent in 1954. He spent most of his eighteen seasons as an outfielder in the Indians' farm system; however, he also played some first and third base. In 1968, while with the Chicago White Sox’ Triple-A affiliate, the Hawaii Islanders, Williams pitched in one game, striking out two and walking one, while yielding no hits in two innings pitched.

During his brief big league career, Williams made twelve plate appearances, drawing a walk, but not collecting a hit in any of his official at bats. He was also hit by a pitch once, after which he scored his only career run (one out later) on a Tommy Davis single. He was 37 years old when he made his MLB debut.

== Coaching ==
After his playing days, he became owner of Billy Williams' Men's Boutique in Oakland, California.

Williams spent eleven seasons coaching in the Cleveland Indians organization. In 1990 and 1991, he served as an MLB coach under Tribe skipper John McNamara.

From 2000 to 2004, Williams coached hitting and third base, while also working with outfielders and base runners for the Sioux Falls Canaries. He became hitting coach for the American Association of Independent Professional Baseball's Sioux City Explorers in 2005, serving as interim manager for the last month of the season. Williams’ managerial record was 44–52. In his final season with the Explorers, 2009, he served as bench coach.
