= Billy Williams (rugby, born 1925) =

Wales international rugby union & league footballer

Personal information
- Full name: William E. Williams
- Born: 28 March 1925 Abertillery/Cwmtillery, Wales
- Died: 27 December 2007 (aged 82) Telford, England

Playing information

Rugby union
- Position: Wing
Club
Years	Team	Pld	T	G	FG	P
1944–47	Newport RFC	41	25
Representative
Years	Team	Pld	T	G	FG	P
≤1945–≥45	Monmouthshire
	Wales XV

Rugby league
- Position: Wing
Club
Years	Team	Pld	T	G	FG	P
1947–≥47	Swinton

William E. Williams (28 March 1925 – 27 December 2007) was a Welsh rugby union, and professional rugby league footballer who played in the 1940s. He played representative level rugby union (RU) for Wales XV and Monmouthshire County RFC, and at club level for Newport RFC, as a wing, and club level rugby league (RL) for Swinton, as a wing.

== Background ==
Billy Williams was born in Abertillery/Cwmtillery, Wales, and he died aged 82 in Telford, Shropshire, England.

== Playing career ==
=== International honours ===
Billy Williams represented Wales XV (RU) while at Newport RFC in the 'Victory International' non-Test match(es) between December 1945 and April 1946.

=== County honours ===
Billy Williams represented Monmouthshire County RFC (RU) against New Zealand in 1945.

== Personal life ==
Bill Williams' marriage to Muriel (née Hiley) (birth registered February 1926 in Swansea district – died August 2004) was registered during third ¼ 1948 in Swansea District, they were married until her death in August 2004. They had one daughter Rebecca J. Williams (birth registered second ¼ 1956 (age 69–70) in Loughborough district), and four grandchildren (Rhiannon, James, Liz and Kate). After retiring from playing rugby Bill Williams became a Mathematics and Physical education teacher, and school rugby union coach at Loughborough Grammar School from 1950 to 1962, and later in Broadstairs, Kent at St. Lawrence College, Ramsgate.

== Notes ==
The page on the walesonline.co.uk website entitled 'Welsh stars still had a rugby ball in wartime' states that Billy Williams had already changed code to rugby league at the time of the 'Victory International' matches. However, the blackandambers.co.uk website indicates that he was still a rugby union footballer for Newport RFC at the time. Billy Williams was definitely active playing for Wales and the Victory Internationals during World War II, as well as working in the coal mines as one of the Bevin Boys.
