= Billy Williams (footballer, born 1888) =

Australian rules footballer

Personal information
- Full name: William Gruby Williams
- Born: 2 May 1888; Eaglehawk, Victoria
- Died: 4 July 1946 (aged 58); Queensland
- Original team: Eaglehawk / Mines Rovers

Playing career^{1}
Years	Club	Games (Goals)
1907	St Kilda	7 (4)
- ^{1} Playing statistics correct to the end of 1907.

William Gruby Williams (2 May 1888 — 4 July 1946) was an Australian rules footballer who played with St Kilda in the Victorian Football League (VFL).

== Family ==
The only son of Henry Roberts Williams, MLA (1848–1935), and his first wife, Kate Williams (1854–1891), née Gruby, William Gruby Williams was born at Eaglehawk, Victoria on 2 May 1888.

== Death ==
He died in Queensland on 4 July 1946.
