= Immigration Act of 1882 =

United States federal law

- Long title: An Act to regulate Immigration.
- Enacted by: the 47th United States Congress
- Effective: August 3, 1882

Citations
- Public law: Pub. L. 47–376
- Statutes at Large: 22 Stat. 214

Legislative history
- Signed into law by President Chester A. Arthur on August 3, 1882

The Immigration Act of 1882 is a United States federal law signed by President Chester A. Arthur on August 3, 1882. It imposed a head tax on non-citizens of the United States who came to American ports and restricted certain classes of people from immigrating to America, including criminals, the insane, or "any person unable to take care of him or herself." The act created what is recognized as the first federal immigration bureaucracy and laid the foundation for more regulations on immigration, such as the Immigration Act of 1891.

== Background ==
Prior to the passage of the Immigration Act of 1882, the United States Congress had passed two significant acts regarding immigration. The first was the Page Act of 1875, which restricted the immigration of forced laborers coming from Asia. This had a major effect on the immigration of Asian indentured workers and women; specifically, women presumed to be immigrating to work as prostitutes. The second was the Chinese Exclusion Act of 1882. This act halted all legal immigration of Chinese laborers and is considered by many to be the first major exclusionary immigration restriction on an entire nationality enacted by the United States. While both of these acts resulted from public fear of the Chinese influence in the labor market and the economy, they also derived from simple prejudice and the public perception of these immigrants' inability to assimilate into American culture.

During the same time that America immigration was restricting Asian (specifically Chinese) immigration, many also criticized the influx of European immigrants – later referred to as the "Great Wave" – coming to the United States. As Europe's urban industrialization was changing the demographic landscape of life in many European cities, millions looked to immigrate in order to find opportunity in America. Calling it the "most massive of all human migrations to date," scholar Otis. L. Graham reported that almost "27 million immigrants settled in the United States between 1880 and 1930". Furthermore, in Debating American Immigration: 1882–Present, Roger Daniels explained how "great growth in the volume of immigration in the Gilded Age made some kind of organized administration necessary". This need and call for an "organized administration" would later be somewhat realized in the administrative outcomes of the Immigration Act of 1882.

While the Immigration Act of 1882 shared the principle of immigration restriction with the two aforementioned acts, it was different in a fundamental way. Unlike the Chinese Exclusion act, the Immigration Act of 1882 would not limit all immigration from a certain country or region. Certain European immigrants were considered extremely desirable, so to limit by region would deny desirable immigrants as well. Instead, to limit immigration based on excluding certain kinds of people who were deemed "undesirable", there needed to be a piece of legislation capable of adhering to a more comprehensive, exclusionary approach that would be administered through a federal government agency with federal policy.

== The Act ==
On August 3, 1882, the forty-seventh United States Congress passed the Immigration Act of 1882. It is considered by many to be "first general immigration law" due to the fact that it created the guidelines of exclusion through the creation of "a new category of inadmissible aliens."

There were two main components of the Immigration Act of 1882. The first was to create a "head tax" that would be imposed upon certain immigrants entering the country. The Act states that "There shall be levied, collected and paid a duty of fifty cents for each and every passenger not a citizen of the United States who shall come by steam or sail vessel from a foreign port to any port within the United States." This money would be paid into the United States Treasury and "shall constitute a fund called the immigration fund." These funds would be used to "defray the expense of regulating immigration under this act." Scholar Roger Daniels commented that the head tax eventually "would rise, in stages, to eight dollars by 1917. In most years the government collected more in head taxes than it spent on administration."

The creation of such administration, and the need to collect and disburse the head taxes throughout the bureaucratic chain, led to the creation of "the first immigration bureaucracy." It was a significant turning point of immigration policy in terms of relying on federal level legislation and administration. While this was not the first federal immigration law, as others were mentioned previously, states and local levels of immigration ports were mainly in control of immigration policy. The Immigration Act of 1882 was the beginning of the "contours of federal oversight" in immigration policy administration. In addition to the head tax, the Act also stipulated the responsibility of government agents to inspect ports and vessels bringing immigrants into the country.

This then led to the second historically significant component of the Act. Upon inquiry of the vessels transporting immigrants, immigration officials were given the authority to expel certain immigrants based on criteria laid out within the Act. The legislation dictated that "If on such examination there shall be found among such passengers any convict, lunatic, idiot, or any person unable to take care of him or herself without becoming a public charge, they shall report the same in writing to the collector of such port, and such person shall not be permitted to land." Furthermore, if a criminal was found to be on board, it was the fiscal responsibility of the ship that brought the immigrant there to take them back out of the United States. The criminal provision of the act did not include immigrants who were "convicted of political offenses, reflecting the traditional American belief that the United States is a haven for those persecuted by foreign tyrants."

== Legacy ==
One of the long-lasting legacies of this act is public charge doctrine. The act made those "likely to become a public charge" inadmissible to the United States and potentially deportable within 5 years of arrival. At the time, this status could be assigned to any number of people including pregnant or single women, the disabled, the sick, or the poor. Daniels commented that the "'LPC clause' originally only kept out persons who were obviously unable to support themselves, but in the twentieth century the executive branch broadened it, first to keep out poor Asian Indians and Mexicans and then to keep out poor people generally." The Immigration Act of 1882 was the first piece of immigration regulation to contain this kind of comprehensive subjective restriction, and it would continue on into contemporary conversations and debates regarding immigration.

== See also ==
- Head Money Cases: A U.S. Supreme Court case challenging the law.
- Liable to become a Public Charge, a doctrine established in the law
- Passenger Act of 1882
