= Bill Williams (footballer, born 1929) =

Australian rules footballer

Personal information
- Full name: Bill Williams
- Born: 22 June 1929
- Died: 10 August 2009 (aged 80)
- Original team: Spotswood
- Height: 180 cm (5 ft 11 in)
- Weight: 76 kg (168 lb)

Playing career^{1}
| Years | Club | Games (Goals) |
| 1948–49 | Richmond | 9 (3) |
- ^{1} Playing statistics correct to the end of 1949.

Bill Williams (22 June 1929 – 10 August 2009) was a former Australian rules footballer who played with Richmond in the Victorian Football League (VFL).

He won the Stawell Gift in 1956.
