= William Peere Williams =

William Peere Williams may refer to:

- William Peere Williams (1664–1736), Member of Parliament for Bishops Castle (1722–1727)
- Sir William Williams, 2nd Baronet, of Clapton (1730–1761), Member of Parliament for New Shoreham (1758–1761)
- William Peere Williams-Freeman (1742–1832), Royal Navy officer and admiral of the fleet

== See also ==
- William Williams (disambiguation)
