= Billy Williams (footballer, born 1905) =

English footballer (1905–1994)

- Williams with West Ham United

Personal information
- Full name: William Dennis Williams
- Date of birth: 27 September 1905
- Place of birth: Leytonstone, England
- Date of death: 8 March 1994 (aged 88)
- Height: 5 ft 8 in (1.73 m)
- Position: Forward

Youth career
- Fairburn House

Senior career*
Years	Team	Apps	(Gls)
1921–1927	West Ham United	33	(7)
1927–1928	Chelsea	2	(0)
Total		35	(7)
- * Club domestic league appearances and goals

William Dennis Williams (27 September 1905 – 8 March 1994) was an English professional footballer who played as a forward.

== Career ==
Born in Leytonstone, he became the youngest ever professional at 15 years of age, when in 1921 he signed for West Ham United from Fairbairn House. On 6 May 1922 (making an appearance against Blackpool) at aged 16 years and 221 days, he became West Ham's youngest ever player; a record he held until Reece Oxford made his debut 23 days younger in 2015. The forward made 44 appearances in all competitions and scored nine goals for West Ham before joining Chelsea in 1927. He played only one season for Chelsea, playing only two games without scoring.
