= Bill Williams (footballer, born 1904) =

Australian rules footballer

Personal information
- Full name: William H. Williams
- Born: 22 September 1904
- Died: 3 February 1993 (aged 88)
- Original team: New Town

Playing career^{1}
Years	Club	Games (Goals)
1927	Fitzroy	4 (0)
- ^{1} Playing statistics correct to the end of 1927.

Bill Williams (22 September 1904 – 3 February 1993) was an Australian rules footballer who played with Fitzroy in the Victorian Football League (VFL).
