= Bill Williams (1900s footballer) =

English footballer

William Williams was an English footballer. His regular position was as a forward. He played for Everton, Blackburn Rovers, Bristol City, and Manchester United.
