= Cicero Mitchell =

American politician

Cicero Mitchell was an American blacksmith and state legislator in Mississippi. He was born in North Carolina. He represented Holmes County, Mississippi in the Mississippi House of Representatives from 1870 to 1871 and in 1878.

In 1869 he was elected with fellow "Radical Republicans" from Holmes County to the state house.

== See also ==
- African American officeholders from the end of the Civil War until before 1900
