= Billy Williams (sportsman) =

English cricketer and rugby union footballer, administrator and referee

William Williams (12 April 1861 – 14 April 1951) was an English first-class cricketer active 1885–1902 who played for Middlesex and Marylebone Cricket Club (MCC). He was born in Notting Hill and died in Hampton Wick. He played in 38 first-class matches as a right-handed batsman, scoring 465 runs with a highest score of 40; as a right-arm leg break bowler, taking 63 wickets with a best performance of seven for 38; and as an occasional wicketkeeper, holding 32 catches and completing four stumpings.

Williams was also involved in rugby union. He played 50 matches for Harlequins and then became an administrator and international match referee. In 1907, he purchased Twickenham, originally a cabbage patch, for England rugby's governing body the Rugby Football Union (RFU).
