= Bill K. Williams =

American Tlingit politician and businessman (1943–2019)

Member of the Alaska House of Representatives from the 1st district
- In office January 11, 1993 - January 18, 2005
- Succeeded by: Jim Elkins

Mayor of Saxman, Alaska
- In office 1976–1983

Personal details
- Born: May 21, 1943 Ketchikan, Alaska
- Died: May 12, 2019 (aged 75) Ketchikan, Alaska
- Party: Democratic Party; Republican Party (1998-2019)
- Occupation: Businessman

William K. Williams (May 21, 1943 – May 12, 2019) was an American Tlingit politician and businessman.

Williams was born in Ketchikan, Alaska. He graduated from Ketchikan High School in 1962, before becoming a longshoreman. He was on the Saxman, Alaska City Council and served as Mayor of Saxman from 1976 to 1983. He served in the Alaska House of Representatives from 1993 to 2004 and was a Democrat. In 1998, he switched to the Republican Party. Williams died in Ketchikan, Alaska.
