= Medical exclusion of immigrants =

Applicants for immigration into the United States must meet certain medical standards, as assessed by the Report of Medical Examination and Vaccination Record (I-693). The purpose of the medical exam is to ensure that an applicant is “not inadmissible to the United States on public health grounds." Inadmissibility is defined in Act 212 of the Immigration and Nationality Act (INA). Accordingly, an alien is inadmissible if he or she has a communicable disease of public health significance, lacks the required vaccines, is a drug abuser or addict, or has a physical or mental disorder with a behavior, or history of a behavior, that is a threat to “the property, safety, or welfare of the alien or others”.

== Communicable diseases of public health significance ==
The current communicable diseases of public health significance include the following: Tuberculosis, Syphilis, Chancroid, Gonorrhea, Granuloma Inguinale, Lymphogranuloma Venereum, Hansen's Disease (Leprosy) and “quarantinable diseases designated by any Presidential Executive Order”. International public health emergencies, as determined by the International Health Regulations (IHR) are also included. An applicant with one of these diseases can still be admitted if it is under the “national interest” or if they are the “spouse, unmarried son, unmarried daughter, minor unmarried lawfully adopted child, father, or mother of a U.S. citizen, alien lawfully admitted for permanent residence, or an alien issued an immigrant visa, or is a VAWA self-petitioner”. In 2009, 482 of the 993 potential LPRS that were originally denied for communicable disease were accepted.

== Vaccinations ==
The vaccination requirement includes the following vaccinations: Mumps, Measles, Rubella, Tetanus, diphtheria, Meningococcal disease, Pneumococcal disease, Haemophilus influenzae type B, Rotavirus, Varicella, Influenza, Hepatitis A and B, Pertussis, and Polio. CDC added COVID-19 to the immigration vaccination requirements effective Oct 1, 2021, and USCIS implemented it for I-693 exams the same date (announced via CDC Technical Instructions on Aug 17, 2021; USCIS policy alert Sept 14, 2021). CDC removed the COVID-19 vaccination requirement for immigrant-visa applicants effective March 11, 2025.

== Examination ==
The examination “consists of a physical examination, an evaluation (skin test/chest x-ray examination) for tuberculosis, and blood test for syphilis”. All immigrants are required to have this examination conducted by a panel physician overseas before they come to America. Foreign nationals pay for their own exam but the cost is covered by the US government for refugees. I-693, the Report of Medical Examination and Vaccination Record, is used to report the medical examination to officials. There is no filing fee for the I-693 form.

== Regulation ==
Medical inspections fall under the authority of Customs and Border Protection (CBP) division the Department of Homeland Security (DHS), as it is responsible for the inspection of all people who enter the country. The medical exam guidelines are created by the Centers for Disease Control’s Division of Global Migration and Quarantine. The Department of Health and Human Services is responsible for “promulgating” the regulations.

== Legislative history ==
Statutory health exclusion began with the Immigration Act of 1891, which barred “‘persons suffering from a loathsome or a dangerous contagious disease’”. This required an inspection of all aliens at port of entry. The law also placed responsibility on the steamship companies to “vaccinate, disinfect, and medically examine emigrants to certify their health prior to departure.”. In 1893, Congressional action required emigrants to “answer a long list of questions prior to departure, their answers practically constituting a medical history of each individual." Ten years later, the 1903 Immigration Act excluded the insane and epileptics. Insanity was described “as a deranged condition, characterized by delusions, depression, or homicidal tendencies”. In 1907, the premise of exclusion based on mental health was expanded with the addition of “imbeciles, the feebleminded, and the physically or mentally defective." The defects were excludable if they were “of a nature which may affect the ability of such alien to earn a living’”.

The Immigration Act of 1917 added the “classification of constitutional psychopathic inferiority” and lowered the criteria to be classified as insane to one previous attack of insanity (compared to previous two or more in 1907). This also included disabilities and diseases such as: “arthritis, asthma, bunions, deafness, deformities, flat feet, heart disease, hernia, hysteria, poor eyesight, poor physical development, spinal curvature, vascular disease of the heart, and varicose veins.” The early legislation created a “list of medical and psychiatric conditions that grew longer each year”. This led to an increase in the percentage of rejected immigrants that were rejected based on medical criteria from two percent in 1898 to 57 percent in 1913 and finally to 69 percent in 1915. The increasing regulation was tied to the rise of bacteriology, the use of eugenics to protect against “racial degeneracy,” and the expansion of the federal government’s involvement in immigration. Eugenics was publicly adopted by the Surgeon General and Public Health Service “to help stem the flood of "inferior stock". The inferior stock mentality was adopted in the quota system of the Immigration Act of 1924, which marked the beginning of examination of immigrants in their home countries.

In the Immigration and Nationality Act of 1952 (INA), seven of the 31 grounds for exclusion were health-related. A few decades later, under the Immigration Act of 1990, the health related grounds were “streamlined and modernized all of the grounds for inadmissibility into nine broad categories”. Under the act, “Congress recodified the health-related ground for inadmissibility to include any alien “who is determined (in accordance with regulations prescribed by the Secretary of Health and Human Services) to have a communicable disease of public health significance”.

In 1993, the National Institutes of Health Revitalization Act added HIV as excludable. This was done by a Congressional amendment that added exclusion based on “’infection with the etiological agent for acquired immune deficiency syndrome’”. HIV was later removed from the exclusions in 2009 and effective by law on January 4, 2010. The vaccination requirement was added with the Illegal Immigration Reform and Immigrant Responsibility Act of 1996. Vaccinations were required for “nine ‘vaccine-preventable diseases’” including: “mumps, measles, rubella, polio, tetanus and diphtheria toxoids, pertussis, influenza type B and hepatitis B”.

== Historical inspection process ==
=== Ellis Island ===
There were four inspection lines separated by iron railings, which then converge into two lines As the immigrants, primarily European, walked through the lines there were six details of quick glance inspection: “the scalp, face, neck, hands, gait, and general condition, both mental and physical”. Those that were suspected of a physical or mental disability were chalked on their shoulder with a letter corresponding to the possible disability. Approximately 15-25 percent of immigrants were chalked. The following chalk markings were used: B=back; C= conjunctivitis; CT= trachoma; E= eyes; F= face; Ft= feet; G= goiter; H= heart; K= hernia; L= lameness; N=neck; P= physical and lungs; Pg= pregnancy; Sc= scalp; S= senility; x=mental defect; X-circle=definite signs of mental defect; hand, measles, nails, skin, temperature, vision, voice were written out in full. Immigrants who failed the health inspections were often sent to the Ellis Island Immigrant Hospital for further care.

The mental exam at Ellis Island was conducted using tests such as a wooden board puzzle, a cube test, or the Binet-Simon intelligence test. The puzzle consisted of cookie-cutter shapes that the subject had to put in place correctly. Under the cube test, “the examiner touched four or five different cubes one after another in a definite order. The subject tried to imitate the examiner, touching the same cubes in the same order. Failure usually resulted in debarment."

The “immigrants waited as long as 48 hours for their inspection” but the average immigrant was at the island for two or three hours. The examinations at Ellis Island “conducted by officers of the Public Health Service”. The inspectors made “every effort” to detect signs of mental or physical defect. As many as “50 to 100 per cent of immigrants who enter the inspection plant are questioned by the medical examiner in order to elicit signs of mental disease or defect”. However, the race, sex and overall appearance of passengers inspected influenced how they were questioned. The number questioned was also influence by the total number of passengers that needed to be inspected because of the ratio of inspector immigrants to inspector. The ratios were 200,000: 6, 500,000: 8, and 900,000: 16 in 1892, 1902, and 1905, respectively.

The inspection at Ellis Island was also relative to the social class of the immigrant. The “first- and second-class passengers on steamships arriving in New York were examined in the privacy of their cabins”. The “immigrants traveling third class, or steerage, were subjected to a medical inspection designed to weed out the diseased or mentally unfit once they arrived at the entry port”.

=== Angel Island ===
This was a port with a large proportion of Chinese, Japanese and Korean immigrants. The inspection was tailored toward exclusion of this group. Whites and other races were separated prior to inspection. Excludable diseases were those that were more common among Asians, yet treatable and not a threat to the American public, such as uncinariasis, filariasis, and clonorchiasis. Stool specimens exams were used to test for this at Angel Island. The test was given to “almost all immigrants coming into West Coast ports, but only sporadically from newcomers arriving on the Atlantic seaboard or via Mexico and Canada”.

=== Mexican border ===
Before the early 1900s, Mexicans were able to move freely across the border without regulation. With the Mexican Revolution, American officials had an increased awareness of the open border and Mexican immigrants were “categorized as diseased and dirty”. Mexicans bathed every time they crossed the border. At the border, “entrants were stripped naked, showered with kerosene, examined for lice and nits, and vaccinated against smallpox”. These baths lasted into the 1920s. In 1917 an inspection and quarantine was issued based on a threat for typhus. The threat lasted for several months, the medical inspection continued into the 1930s after there was no longer a serious threat. Medical inspection of Mexican immigrants was not opposed because health was a prerequisite for labor. The inspections were also differentiated by class, as “a sizeable number of Mexicans—especially recognized commuters, those who were well dressed, and those who rode first class on the train—were exempted from the disinfection drill”.
