= William Williams (Halifax RLFC) =

Wales international rugby league footballer

Billy Williams
Personal information
- Full name: William J. Williams
- Born: unknown Wales
- Died: unknown

Playing information

Rugby union
Club
Years	Team	Pld	T	G	FG	P
	Pontypool RFC

Rugby league
- Position: Wing
Club
Years	Team	Pld	T	G	FG	P
1906–12	Halifax	147	113	3	0	345
Representative
Years	Team	Pld	T	G	FG	P
1908	Yorkshire	2	2	0	0	6
1908–10	Wales	4	3	0	0	9

William "Billy" J. Williams (birth unknown – death unknown) was a Welsh professional rugby league footballer who played in the 1900s. He played at representative level for Wales, and at club level for Halifax, as a wing.

== Club career ==
Williams was signed by Halifax from rugby union club Pontypool RFC in 1906. He played regularly for Halifax between 1906 and 1912. His most prolific season came in 1908–09 when he scored 49 tries, making him the season's joint-leading try scorer with Joe Miller.

== International honours ==
Billy Williams won 4 caps for Wales in 1908–10 while at Halifax.
