= William Emrys Williams =

Sir William Emrys Williams, CBE (5 October 1896 – 30 March 1977) was editor-in-chief of Penguin Books from 1936 to 1965 and an educationalist and powerhouse of popular education in the 20th century. A close collaborator with Allen Lane, Penguin's founder, for over thirty years, Williams was the cultural force behind Penguin Books' success and was the creator of the Pelican imprint.

== Pre-War career ==
Williams was born in Manchester. He became devoted to lifelong learning and cultural democracy and had close connections with and involvement in many different enterprises in popular education, in particular through his role as Secretary of the British Institute of Adult Education (BIAE), a role in which Williams began in 1925. Williams wanted to turn the BIAE into a more influential, dynamic voice in the debate about adult education, and to engage a wider audience in that debate. It was with this goal in mind that Williams founded the Arts for the People scheme in 1934. The scheme brought important works of art to gallery-less towns and to working-class audiences and later stimulated the formation of the Arts Council, of which Williams was Secretary-General from 1951 to 1953.

Williams was also involved with the Workers' Educational Association (WEA), from which the BIAE became independent in 1925: Williams was editor - at times controversially - of the WEA journal, The Highway, between 1930 and 1939.

== World War Two ==
During the Second World War, Williams insisted - despite some controversy - on the right to education, in particular in current affairs, for servicemen and women, and so in mid-1941 Williams established the Army Bureau of Current Affairs (ABCA) and ran it for the duration of the war. For this role, he became known as ABCA Bill.

The ABCA was a programme of general education for citizenship for servicemen and women: officers attended courses on conducting discussions groups, and these were started as hourly sessions each week. Such was the response that ABCA rapidly expanded resulting in photographic display; wall newspapers articles written by the men themselves; and an "Anglo American Brains Trust". The ABCA is often credited with having an impact on the result of the 1945 General Election and played an important part in post-war period during the building of the "new peace".

After the war and under the auspices of the Carnegie Trust, Williams transformed the ABCA into the Bureau of Current Affairs, moving their offices to Piccadilly in London and continued their activities in peace-time with the assistance of several ABCA contributors including the artists James Boswell.

In 1940, Williams was instrumental in the establishment, by royal charter, of the Committee for the Encouragement of Music and the Arts (CEMA), to help promote and maintain British culture. CEMA was government funded and was chaired initially by Lord De La Warr, President of the Board of Education and by John Maynard Keynes from 1941. By 1945, 46 art organisations were funded by CEMA and in 1946 CEMA was re-chartered as the Arts Council, with Williams as the Council's first Secretary General.

== Later career ==
A regular broadcaster, Williams was talks critic of The Listener; radio critic of The Observer; and television critic of the New Statesman. Before he took to criticism, Williams was himself a successful broadcaster and televisor. He was a Trustee of the National Gallery.

In 1942, he edited A Book of English Essays, and in 1957 an enlarged edition. In 1956 he published The Penguin Story MCMXXXV–MCMLVI, a history of Penguin Books up to that date, and in 1961 he edited The Reader's Guide, a guide to the best books across all fields of knowledge and interest. In 1973, he published Allen Lane : A Personal Portrait, a biography of Sir Allen Lane (1902–1970).

Williams was appointed a CBE in 1946 and knighted in 1955. In 1964 he was given the American Medal of Freedom.

A portrait of Williams is held by the National Portrait Gallery, London and a bronze bust of his portrait is held in the Arts Council art collection.

== Personal life ==
Williams had a turbulent personal life combining a happy marriage to the economist Gertrude Rosenblum Williams and a twenty-year relationship with Estrid Bannister. He died in Aylesbury, and his secretary, Joyce Lyon, burned his memoirs the night after his death, before taking her own life.
