= 1886 Seattle riot =

Anti-Chinese lynchings

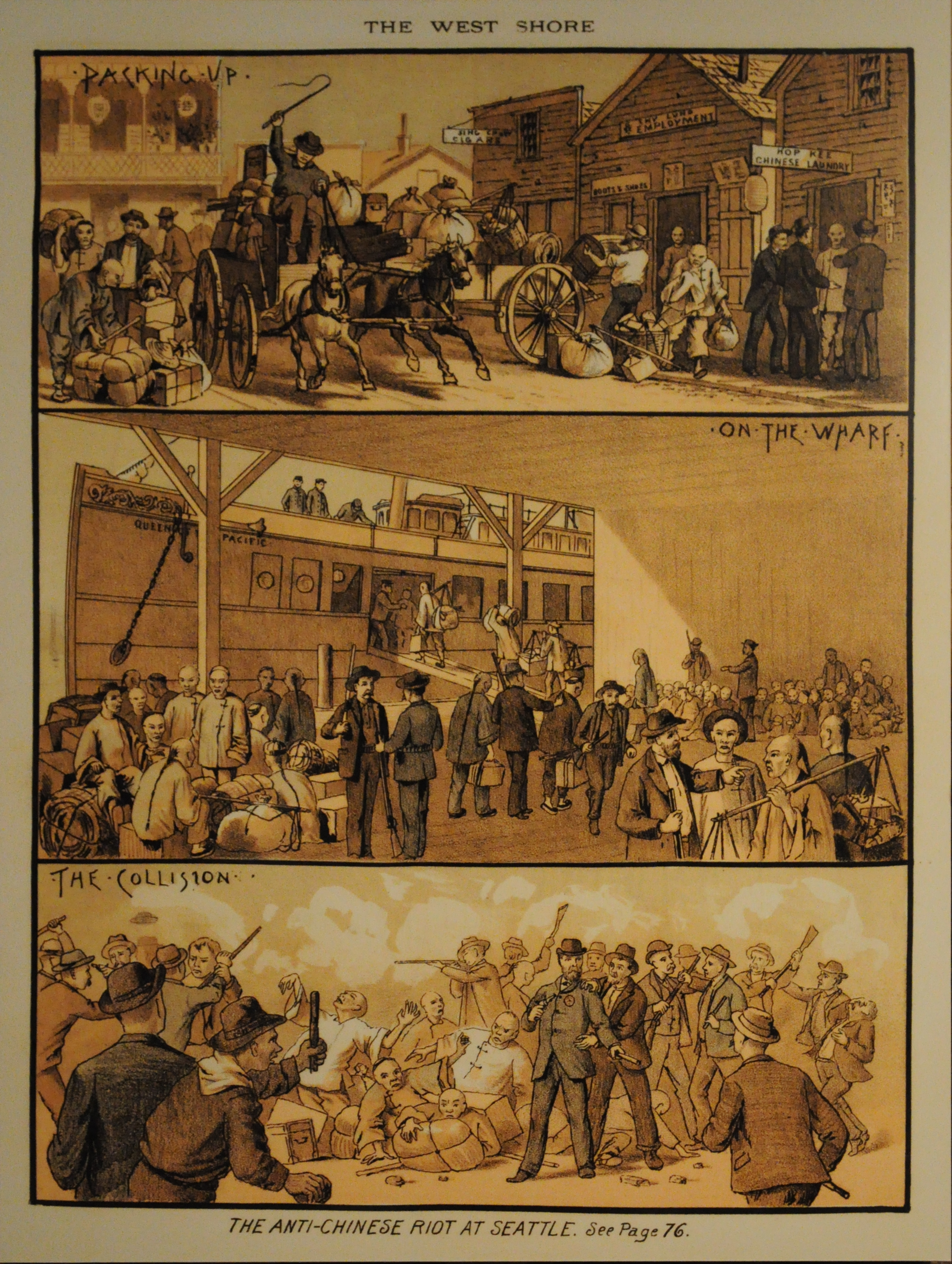
An artist's interpretation of the riot, from West Shore Magazine, March 1886. The three panels are entitled, respectively "Packing Up", "On the Wharf", and "The Collision".

The Seattle riot of 1886 occurred on February 6–9, 1886, in Seattle, Washington, amidst rising anti-Chinese sentiment caused by labor competition in the Western United States. The dispute arose when a mob affiliated with a local Knights of Labor chapter formed small committees to carry out a forcible expulsion of all Chinese from the city. Violence erupted between the Knights of Labor rioters and federal troops ordered in by President Grover Cleveland. The incident resulted in the removal of over 200 Chinese civilians from Seattle and left two militia men and five rioters seriously injured, with one later dying from his injuries. (Note: Many sources, like Laurie (cited), agree that around 200 Chinese left by ship on the morning of the 7th. Some sources, such as Crowley (cited), say that most of the remaining 150 also left later.)

== Background ==
During the 1840s, the California Gold Rush brought many Chinese people to the United States. Many had come in the hopes of improving their economic conditions, and their arrival was initially welcomed due to labor shortages. According to information from the U.S. Census, the Chinese population increased at a dramatic pace until 1890, though they never accounted for more than 0.2 percent of the U.S. population through the 1800s.

After the Gold Rush, many Chinese people moved into the northwest territories of Oregon, Washington, and Montana in search of work, especially with the new mining opportunities and railroad expansion. Chinese workers developed a reputation for being efficient and were subjected to longer hours and lower wages than White workers despite strike efforts. White-owned companies recruited Chinese workers to undercut higher-paid White workers, which increased anti-Asian sentiment.

Violent outbreaks against Chinese people in America occurred as early as the 1860s and continued to intensify in the 1870s, especially in California. Corporations continued to flood the labor market with Chinese workers. With work in short supply, unions and the White European immigrants who constituted these organizations felt angered and threatened by the Chinese work force. Unions such as the Knights of Labor and the American Federation of Labor supported legislation that limited or excluded Chinese immigration. By the mid-1880s, a wave of anti-Chinese violence grew and spread into the Pacific Northwest.

== Rock Springs ==
Rock Springs was just the first outbreak of many in the West of anti-Chinese violence. It occurred in Rock Springs, in the Wyoming Territory. In the 1870s, the Union Pacific coal mines began firing white strikers and replacing its previously all-white work force with cheaper Chinese laborers. The incident occurred on September 2, 1885. Fighting broke out in the mines between white and Chinese laborers. A mob destroyed and set aflame many Chinese homes, causing an estimated $140,000 of damage, killing 28, injuring 14, and sending the remaining immigrants fleeing into the surrounding area. Later, Governor Francis Warren telegraphed President Cleveland requesting federal military assistance, due to a report that had surfaced that the Chinese, who had fled the town earlier, had now regrouped in nearby Evanston and had armed themselves.

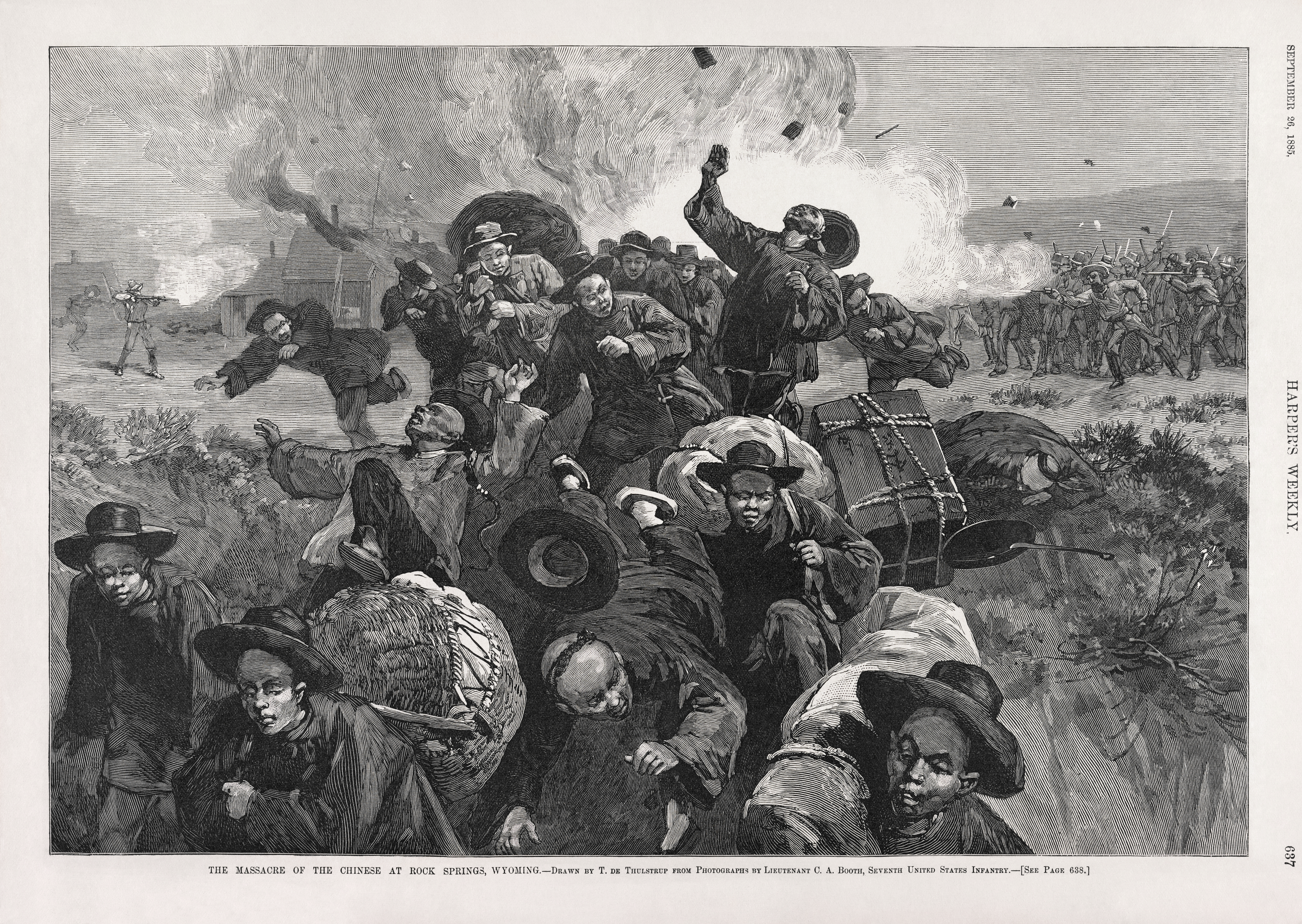
An illustration of the massacre of the Chinese at Rock Springs, Wyoming from Harper's Weekly Vol.29, 1885.

The Chinese and anti-Chinese mobs were set to meet, which prompted the commitment of federal troops to Rock Springs. The soldiers were not under orders to protect the Union Pacific Railroad or to protect the Chinese, as required by the Burlingame Treaty of 1868 with China. Officially, troops were deployed to Rock Springs to "prevent any disruption to the United States mail or the routes over which they are received."

Eventually, diplomatic pressure from the Burlingame Treaty prompted President Cleveland to issue a new order to protect Chinese laborers "at points of threatened or actual violence" now that troops had been committed. The Chinese were then led by four companies of federal troops into the town without incident. This set a precedent for sending federal troops to protect the Chinese immigrants from frequent violence in the area, though the Cleveland administration evaded responsibility for the incident. It also set a precedent because not a single rioter was punished. They did pay a sum of $150,000 to the Chinese government, though never to the immigrants themselves. Federal forces remained in the area for another 14 years after the massacre, and, for the most part, union influence disappeared in the wake of the riot.

== Seattle ==
Tensions in Seattle continued to rise when the Chinese laborers shifted from mining and railroad construction to urban labor. Many whites felt as though the Chinese were driving them from the labor force by agreeing to work for less. They saw the Chinese as racially inferior "semislaves" who were unable to assimilate into the American way of life. Some argued that the hiring of Chinese workers would only serve to lower the standard of living for the average American working man in the West, who would be forced to accept lower wages to compete. Others asserted that the Chinese workers were stripping America of her wealth because many immigrants sent paychecks back to their families in China.

Members of the Knights of Labor were leaders of the organized movement against Chinese workers in Seattle. The Knights in Washington Territory were only loosely affiliated with the national organization. The chapter's organizer was Daniel Cronin, a 38-year-old carpenter who came to the Puget Sound area via California during the summer of 1885. Under Cronin's leadership, the Washington Knights of Labor went from a loose-knit band of workers to an organized and militant "brotherhood". In September 1885, Cronin warned Seattle's workers that riot and bloodshed would follow during the winter if the Chinese were not removed. It was Cronin and the leadership of the Knights of Labor who planned for the systematic expulsion of Seattle's Chinese; the group organized a territorial anti-Chinese congress and declared that all Chinese must leave Seattle by November 1, 1885. After forming local coordinating committees, Cronin stepped away from his post as Knights leader and left the Chinese expulsion, largely, to other individuals.

Disgruntled over the presence of 3000+ Chinese immigrants in the Seattle-Tacoma corridor, the Washington Knights organized a meeting on September 28. The meeting was presided over by Tacoma's mayor, Jacob Weisbach, and the assembled men concluded they must rid the area of "Chinese slave labor". They intended to speak to employers about their discharge, and thus formed local committees to enforce the expulsion if all Chinese were not removed from the town by November 1. Some Chinese were persuaded to evacuate at this point and between November 4–14, some 150 Chinese fled Seattle. This prompted territorial Governor Watson Squire to telegraph President Cleveland for troops, and he received soldiers under the command of Brig. Gen. John Gibbon by train the next morning. These soldiers never took action and were ordered back to garrison on November 17. The tensions did not end there, however, as Knights of Labor meetings continued through January. On February 6, 1886, the Knights again met and charged a six-man committee with delivering an ultimatum to the Chinese that they must leave Seattle or be forcibly removed.

== Riot ==
On the morning of February 7, many "committees" forced their way into Chinese homes, demanding the Chinese pack their bags and report to the steamship Queen of the Pacific at 1 pm. The committees set up wagons through Seattle's Chinatown to haul baggage down to the pier. After a search was conducted for Chinese who fled or hid, the committees led some 350 Chinese from Chinatown to the pier. Local Sheriff John McGraw was aroused to enforce law and order with his force of deputies, but McGraw was sympathetic to the Knights and simply protected the Chinese immigrants from violence on their way to the pier. When Governor Squire ordered the dispersal of the mob and the release of the Chinese, the riotous mob ignored him. Thus, Squire called for the local "Seattle Rifles" militia and requested the aid of federal troops to assist McGraw.

Meanwhile, at the dock, rioters were significantly short of raising the funds needed to transport 350 people by steamship. Only 97 of 350 Chinese had their fare paid. U.S. Justice Greene heard of the incident through an angered Chinese merchant and issued a writ of habeas corpus which required the captain of the Queen to produce the Chinese in court the next morning. At midnight, McGraw along with local militia blocked two attempts by the mob to lead the remaining 253 Chinese to a train to Tacoma. McGraw defused the situation by ordering the train to leave before the mob could reach it.

The next morning, McGraw led the 97 passengers still on the Queen of the Pacific to the territorial court as ordered by Justice Greene. There was an incident along the way as the mob tried to block their progress and 8 Knights leaders were arrested. Once there, Greene informed the Chinese that they had a legal right to remain in the city. Though he promised to protect them, only 16 elected to stay and the rest were escorted back to the ship. By the time they had returned the mob had raised funds for the additional passage of 115 more Chinese and the boat set sail. It was agreed that the remaining 150 Chinese would depart on the steamship George Elder once funds had been raised.

News of the agreement failed to spread throughout Seattle. As McGraw, his deputies, and the militiamen tried to lead the Chinese back to their homes, a new mob formed, incensed at the arrest of their leaders. The militiamen clubbed members of the mob with rifle butts when progress was impeded. When members of the mob began to wrest the militia rifles, shots rang out and stopped only after 2 militia men and 3 rioters lay seriously injured. The mob backed off and prepared for another charge when an extra company of militiamen arrived and sent the crowd into a confused state. Once McGraw stated that those responsible for the shooting would be prosecuted, the crowd dispersed. When a third mob threatened the lives of the militiamen who fired upon the crowd. Governor Squire issued martial law. Overall, five rioters were wounded by militia gunfire. One of them, Charles Stewart, died of his injuries the following morning.

Neither Greene nor Squire believed that McGraw and his combined militia force would be able to enforce martial law in the territory, and federal troops arrived in Seattle on February 10 and found it "devoid of traces...of the rioting". Squire ended martial law and restored local civil order on February 23. Most troops were recalled, but two companies of troops were left in Seattle for another 4 months after the riot.

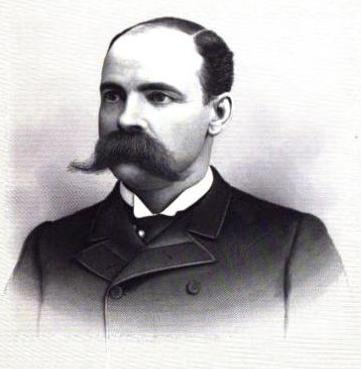
John McGraw, Washington sheriff during the anti-Chinese riot of Seattle in 1886; later a lawyer, second governor of Washington State, and a businessman. Photo circa 1890.

== Aftermath ==
The anti-Chinese violence of the 1880s, like that of the Seattle riot, took place against the background of the 1882 Chinese Exclusion Act that completely barred the immigration of all Chinese workers into the United States. Congress then voted to extend the ban in 1892 and 1902. This led to a dramatically reduced Chinese population in the U.S. in the 1890s into the 1900s. Those who did leave were restricted from being replaced by other Chinese immigrants. Congress paid $276,619.15 to the Chinese government in compensation for the rioting, but the actual victims never saw any such compensation. Though 13 men were tried in court in relation to the riot, not a single one was ever convicted of a crime. Both Mayor Henry Yesler and Sheriff McGraw were unseated in the following election.

Few Chinese continued to reside in the Seattle area following the riot. Many of the Chinese chose to return to China following the wave of racially inspired violence. There was considerable property loss because of their forced and hasty expulsion The Qing government could only seek to secure indemnities for the Seattle riot, knowing that the guilty parties would likely never be brought to answer for their crimes. This was because federal and territorial authorities had been largely unwilling to assist in declaring martial law and arresting the criminals.

The Chinese sought the advice of their Consuls in the U.S. and sent additional diplomats to investigate the matter and report back with possible actions. Ouyang Ming, the Chinese Consul-General of San Francisco concluded that the Chinese were not well liked by either the American public or the government. He proposed that the best way to prevent future harm to Chinese citizens was to bar all Chinese emigration to the states, feeling as though only trouble would result if things were left unchanged. Others, such as influential Governor-General Zhang Zhidang, disagreed. He proposed that the Chinese immigration policy remain fluid because of Chinese interests in the United States, and it did.

Qing officials continued efforts in Washington to combat the unjust restrictions that had been placed on Chinese immigrants following the Chinese Exclusion Act in 1882. The killing of Chinese gradually came to a stop in the years after 1886, however legislation restricting them continued. Protection of current and future Chinese in America proved difficult to achieve.

Chinese consul Goon Dip, a Chinese businessman, was largely responsible for the 2nd wave of Chinese immigration into Seattle and founded the cradle for Seattle's second Chinatown. Soon Japanese and Filipino immigrants also gravitated to the area because of the area's inexpensive housing and storefronts for their own businesses and restaurants.

By the late 1930s, Chinatown was re-established in Seattle as a distinct and proud neighborhood. Many Chinese prospered despite lingering tensions. However, relations again soured after the surprise attack on Pearl Harbor by the Empire of Japan. Many Japanese Americans were rounded up in the spring of 1942 for "internment" camps throughout World War II. In response to anti-Japanese sentiment, many Chinese Americans in Seattle began distinguishing themselves with "I am Chinese" badges declaring that they were not Japanese.

The area's population continued to diversify following World War II, as an increasing number of Filipinos passed through or settled in the area. This prompted Seattle Mayor William Devin to promote a new name for the neighborhood, the "International District," in 1951, though this still rankles some in the Chinese community.

== See also ==
- Seattle shooting
- Anti-Chinese sentiment in the United States
- Anti-Chinese violence in California
- Anti-Chinese violence in Oregon
- Anti-Chinese violence in Washington
- Attack on Squak Valley Chinese laborers, 1885
- Bellingham riots of 1907
- Chinese American history
- Chinese Exclusion Act
- Chinese massacre of 1871
- Hells Canyon massacre, 1887
- History of Seattle before 1900
- History of the Chinese Americans in Seattle
- List of incidents of civil unrest in the United States
- List of United States immigration legislation
- 2021 Atlanta spa shootings
- Pacific Coast Race riots of 1907
- Rock Springs massacre, 1885
- San Francisco riot of 1877
- Tacoma riot of 1885
- Torreón massacre, 1911 in Mexico
