= Supreme Order of Caucasians =

The Supreme Order of Caucasians was a short-lived nativist group that was formally organized in Sacramento, California in April 1876. Its primary goal was to drive the Chinese out of the United States in order to protect white labor. New chapters of the order called “camps” quickly spread across California and Nevada, and the group claimed to have 14,000 members by 1877. The order faded in relevance and influence by the mid 1880’s.

== Background ==
An uptick in the immigration of male Chinese laborers to the Western United States following the 1848 California Gold Rush sparked a new wave of nativism among many of the region’s white inhabitants. Californian nativist opposition to Chinese immigrants was fueled not only by racial prejudice, but also economic concerns, as many whites felt that a continued influx of cheap Chinese labor would result in a reduction of their own wages due to increased competition. Thus, throughout 1860’s and 1870’s, many Californians mobilized to form various anti-Chinese labor organizations, such as the Anti-Coolie Labor Organization, The Workingmen's Party of California, and the Supreme Order of Caucasians.

== Foundation ==
The Order of Caucasians was filed with the California Secretary of State on March 3, 1875. However, it was not until April 1876, that a convention was held in Sacramento to formally organize the group and draft a constitution.

== Structure ==
The Supreme Order of Caucasians was composed of many local chapters, which were referred to as “camps” or “encampments”. These camps were afforded a large deal of independence when it came to their day-to-day operations. Each camp had a chief, as well as several other positions like treasurer and secretary. Positions in the order were generally elective rather than appointive, and elections were held at the camp level.

Beginning in 1876, a convention of the "Supreme Encampment" was held annually in Sacramento, California, to which numerous delegates from camps across California and Nevada were invited. Conventions of the Supreme Encampment usually addressed matters concerning the order as a whole, such as drafting and revising a universal constitution or setting up an endowment.

== Racial views ==
The Supreme Order of Caucasians was a product of a broader wave of nativism and anti-Chinese racism that swept California in the latter half of the 19th century. It was white supremacist and emphasized the making of enemies with those who “tend[ed] to the degradation of the Caucasians”. The Chinese were the primary target of the Order’s racism. Supreme Secretary W.B.G. Keller articulated the racial element of the order’s anti-Chinese position in an 1877 article in the Sacramento Daily Union newspaper by painting Chinese immigrants in a poor light:

The emigrants who have come are from the very lowest classes in the Empire. They are, for the most part, criminals and prostitutes; without the slightest interest in or knowledge of our institutions.

Additionally, Keller attempted to disparage the Chinese by equating their race as a whole with the devastation of the eastern world brought on by the conquests of Ghengis Khan and Tamerlane.

== Labor views and anti-Chinese activism ==
The Supreme Order of Caucasians was one of many Californian groups that blamed competition from increasing numbers of Chinese immigrants for wage stagnation in the state. The order thus sought to protect white labor by barring California’s Chinese population from employment. The order were outspoken supporters of legislative attempts to limit Chinese immigration to America, efforts which ultimately culminated in the Chinese Exclusion Act of 1882.

Throughout the order’s existence, its various chapters staged protests and boycotts against Chinese labor. Various anti-Chinese mass meetings were also held.

In 1876, the Supreme Order of Caucasians held an anti-Chinese meeting in Sacramento which attracted 4,000 members. Later that same year, the order worked alongside the Workingmen’s Party of California to demand that Chinese be excluded from municipal employment and that the government be banned from purchasing any materials from businesses employing Chinese people.

During 1879’s annual session of the Supreme Encampment in Sacramento, a dispatch urging President Rutherford B. Hayes to sign into law The Fifteen Passenger Bill, which permitted no more than 15 Chinese passengers on any ship coming to the United States, was prepared and sent by the Order.

== Public Enemies ==
In order to protect white labor against a perceived Chinese threat, the Supreme Order of Caucasians devised two classes of so-called “public enemies” against which they directed their efforts. The order’s April 1876 constitution outlined the two classes of public enemies as Class A (temporary) and Class B (perpetual). These enemies were to be harassed, with the constitution calling upon “every Caucasian of every camp, encampment and the Supreme Camp, to pursue and injure every one of Class A, while he remains on the list of public enemies, and each and every one of Class B, forever, in all their walks of life, save religion, morality and person.”

Article XV of the constitution concerned Class A public enemies. They were defined as temporary. Any person on the list could be removed from it should they no longer meet the order’s classification criteria. Class A enemies committed relatively minor infractions against the interest of white labor.

Among the criteria outlined in Article XV that rendered someone a Class A public enemy were: “He who removes a white man or native American black man, and installs an Asiatic”; “He who defends, directly or indirectly, an Asiatic against a Caucasian before the law”; “He who rents property to an Asiatic”; and “He who employs an Asiatic on public or contract works”.

Article XVI concerned Class B public enemies. They were defined as perpetual enemies of the order, permanently banned from joining its ranks under any circumstances. Class B public enemies generally fell into two mutually inclusive categories: those who sought to directly hinder the order, and those who more intentionally worked to improve the economic standing of the Chinese.

Among the criteria outlined in Article XVI that rendered someone a Class B public enemy were: “He who betrays the secrets of the order"; “He who violates, knowingly, his obligation in regard to public enemies"; “He who has, or does, contact with, and brought, or brings, to America, Asiatics"; and “He who has taught Asiatics any of the trades, callings, or professions of Caucasian civilization”.

However, the Supreme Order quickly revised its constitutional conception of public enemies. On March 23, 1877, Chico, California’s Chico Evening Record newspaper published a report citing these articles from the April 1876 Constitution as evidence to support a claim that the militant nativist ideology perpetuated by the Order of Caucasians and similar organizations was a key cause of the arson of Chico’s Chinatown earlier in the month. In response, the order’s Supreme Secretary W.B.G. Keller wrote a statement in the Sacramento Daily Union newspaper on March 26 where he repudiated the use of violence against the Chinese and claimed the constitutional articles that had indirectly advocated for it were misguided and had been removed in later revisions:

So far as the quotations are concerned they are correct, as regards the Constitution referred to. It was the first Constitution gotten up, very crude in many particulars, defective as all new organizations are at the beginning. The Constitution referred to was adopted April 19, 1876, during a time of great excitement, and many things were overlooked, and many clauses crept in that ought never to have been adopted, but which do not now exist in any manner whatever. After the adoption of the new Constitution on the 15th day of September, 1876, an Encampment was held in this city, and the whole matter reviewed, altered and revised, and by as intelligent a set of men as ever got together. All of the crudities and objectionable sections as quoted by you were stricken from the law, and are not now, in any wise, the law of the Order.

== See also ==
- Anti-Chinese sentiment in the United States
- Anti-Chinese violence in California
- Anti-Chinese legislation in the United States - Wikipedia
