= Chinese massacre =

Chinese massacre may refer to:

== Violence against Chinese people ==
- Chinese Massacre of 1871 (Los Angeles), where 19 Chinese immigrants were lynched
- Rock Springs massacre in 1885, carried out by European-American miners against Chinese-American miners
- Torreón massacre in 1911, where the forces of the Mexican Revolution killed 300 Chinese immigrants in Torreón
- Nanking Massacre in 1937, perpetrated by the Imperial Japanese Army during the Second Sino-Japanese War
- May 1998 riots of Indonesia

== Violence instigated by the Chinese Communist Party ==
- The 1989 Tiananmen Square protests and massacre, where the People's Liberation Army killed hundreds to thousands of civilian protesters.

== Other uses ==
- List of massacres in China
