= Tacoma riot of 1885 =

Forceful expulsion of the Chinese population

The Tacoma riot of 1885, also known as the 1885 Chinese expulsion from Tacoma, involved the forceful expulsion of the Chinese population from Tacoma, Washington Territory, on November 3, 1885. City leaders had earlier proposed a November 1 deadline for the Chinese population to leave the city. On November 3, 1885, a mob that consisted of prominent businessmen, police, and political leaders descended on the Chinese community. The mob marched Chinese residents to a railroad station and forced them to board a train to Portland. In the following days, the structures that remained in the Chinese community were razed. The event was the result of growing anti-Chinese sentiment and violence throughout the American West.

This organized action became known as the "Tacoma method", and despite national and international outcry, it was used as an example of how to forcibly remove Chinese residents from cities and towns throughout the American West. The anti-Chinese sentiment in Tacoma and Washington Territory more broadly made it so that those involved did not face repercussions for their actions.

This impacted Chinese immigration to Tacoma for decades. In 1992, the Chinese Citizens Reconciliation Committee was created. In 1993, the Tacoma City Council issued a statement on the expulsion saying that it was "a most reprehensible occurrence". In 2005, Chinese Reconciliation Park broke ground on the Tacoma waterfront to commemorate the event.

== Background ==
=== Chinese community of Tacoma ===
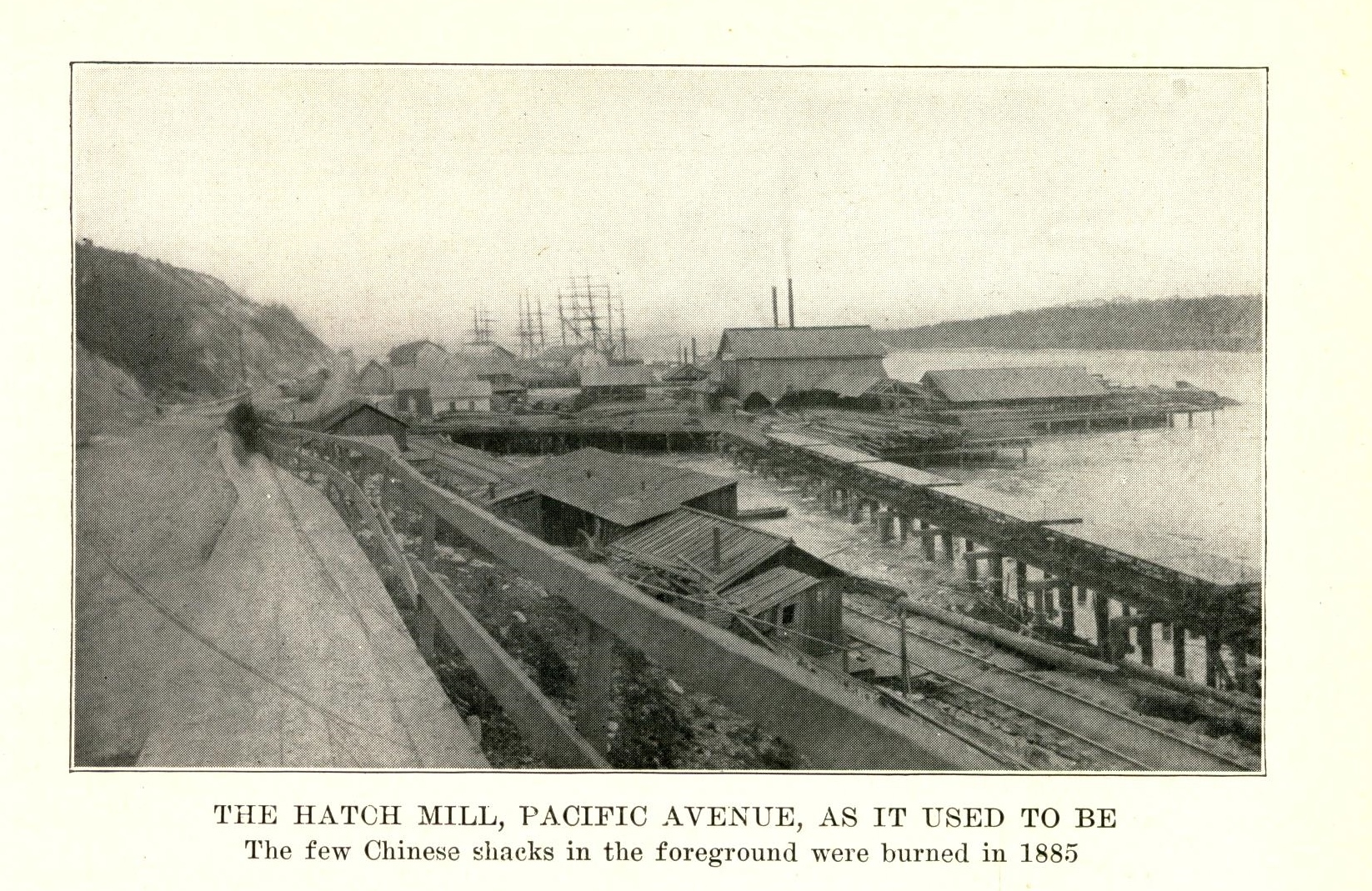
Some members of the Chinese community were situated along Pacific Avenue, near the Hatch Mill. Some of their shacks are pictured here.

In 1873, the Northern Pacific Railway announced plans to situate its western terminus in Tacoma. Given the experience of Chinese laborers on other major railroad projects, they were among the laborers that were hired to work on the new construction. The Northern Pacific Railway completed its Tacoma terminal on December 27, 1873. Because there was still work to be done building wharves and smaller rail lines, Chinese workers remained in the area. The Northern Pacific Railway leased the Chinese land near the train tracks which became the Tacoma Chinatown. This was located on the Tacoma waterfront near present-day Downtown Tacoma.

By the 1880s, there were approximately 1,000 Chinese residents living in Pierce County with 700 of them in Tacoma. There was a fluctuation of the numbers of Chinese residents during this time due to the lack of record keeping and the transient nature of the industries that many Chinese residents worked in. There were several Chinese owned businesses within Chinatown selling groceries and household goods, but the majority of the Chinese were employed in laundries, small stores, hotels, restaurants, and domestic work.

=== Regional and national anti-Chinese sentiment ===
California became the core site of early anti-Chinese sentiment in the United States beginning in the 1850s. While Chinese immigrants enjoyed a much older history in the United States, the true expansion of Chinese immigration to the United States was with the California Gold Rush in 1848. This gave poor Chinese families the hope and opportunity to raise their families. The rate of immigration was relatively small until 18,000 Chinese came to California in 1852. As they formed communities, they developed their own benevolent societies to support them in their new lives. This gave them a connection to their homeland but it also provided them job opportunities, education, recreation, medical help, and assistance in settling disputes.

As Chinese miners began to work in California's mines, tensions began to rise between European and Chinese workers. Similar animus took place once the Chinese began to branch out into other industries. Anti-Chinese sentiment was particularly strong with labor organizations in California. Denis Kearney, an Irish immigrant and one of California's most public anti-Chinese labor leaders, popularized the call of "The Chinese Must Go!" This rallying cry became increasingly common throughout the American West and was used in the buildup to the Chinese expulsion in Tacoma. As anti-Chinese sentiment became common in California, corresponding incidents of violence and anti-Chinese legislation occurred throughout the state. This included several riots as well as ordinances that set limits on housing and property ownership. Racial animus and new economic opportunities led Chinese immigrants to other territories, moving to other parts of the American West and Pacific Northwest.

In the following decades, anti-Chinese sentiment began to be reflected in national policy. The 1882 Chinese Exclusion Act, and the subsequent 1892 Geary Act, were federal laws that targeted Chinese immigrants by barring all new immigration from China. Local sentiment among anti-Chinese activists in the Washington Territory was that this legislation was not being enforced, and that Chinese migrants were entering primarily from British Columbia.

Throughout the 1880s, anti-Chinese incidents became increasingly common. On September 4, 1885, the Rock Springs Massacre occurred in Rock Springs, Wyoming Territory and represented one of the deadliest anti-Chinese incidents in the United States during the nineteenth century. A group of coal miners drove out hundreds of Chinese miners and killed at least 28 of them. News of this event spread nationally and internationally and led to increased friction between the Chinese consulate and the United States government. This would become one of a string of violent incidents directed towards the Chinese population in the Pacific Northwest territories.

This violence soon spread to Washington Territory. On September 7, 1885, in Squak Valley (present-day Issaquah, Washington), a group of white and Native American laborers fired into the tents of Chinese hop pickers and killed three of them. On September 11, 1885, another instance of anti-Chinese violence occurred in the Coal Creek mines of Newcastle, Washington Territory. There, one Chinese miner was kidnapped and the barracks of several dozen Chinese workers was set on fire. On September 19, 1885, in the coal mining community of Black Diamond, Washington Territory, white miners drove the Chinese out and injured nine of them. These events spurred a flurry of organizing activity devoted to expelling the Chinese from other communities in the Washington Territory.

== Growing anti-Chinese sentiment in Tacoma ==
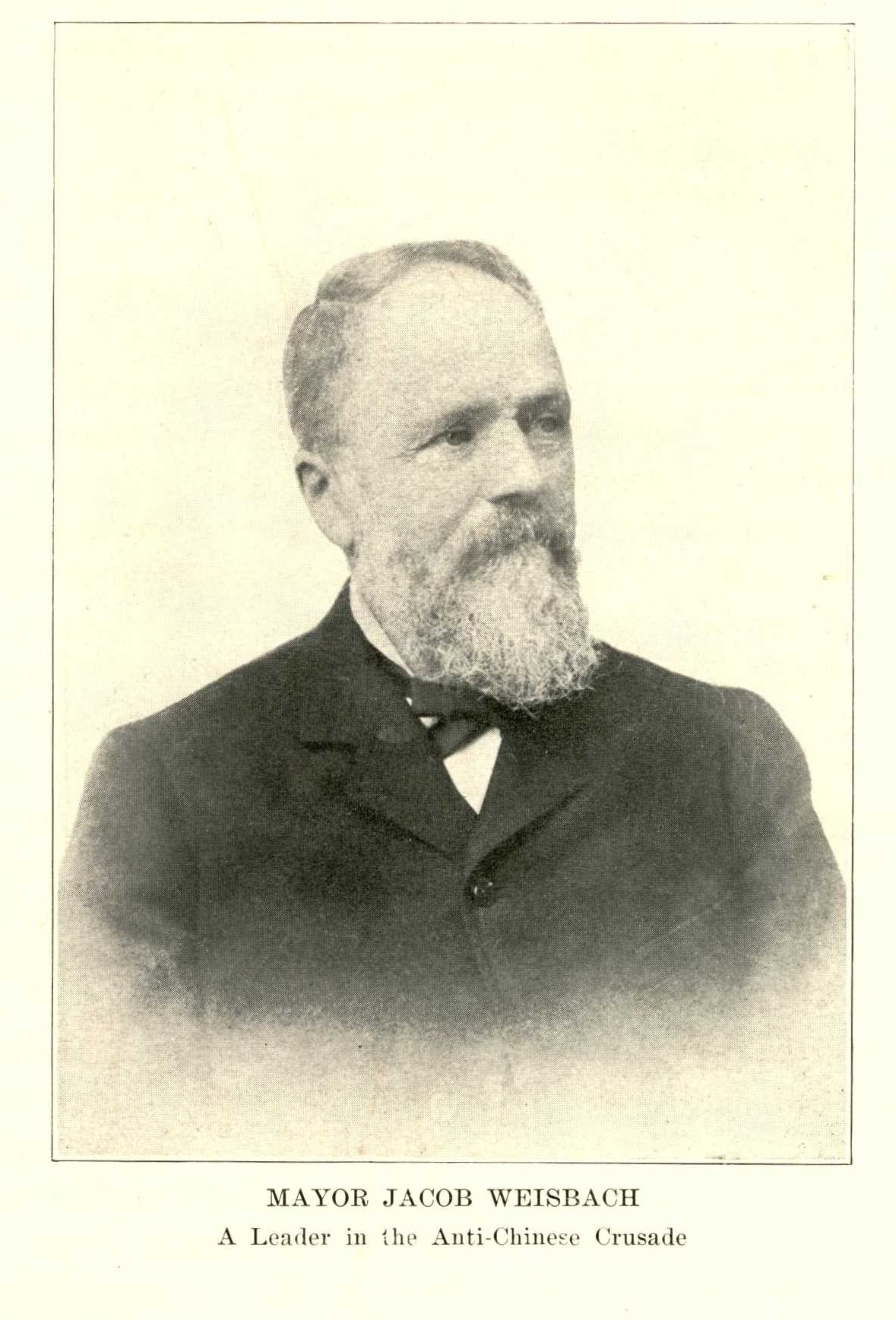
Jacob Weisbach, the mayor of Tacoma during the Chinese expulsion, was a central figure in the anti-Chinese movement in Tacoma.

In February 1885, Tacoma Mayor Jacob Weisbach (a German immigrant) met with a small group of men to discuss the Chinese question. William Christie, who had witnessed the Chinese expulsion that had recently occurred in Eureka, California, was among the attendees. During this meeting, they discussed the actions taken by other localities to expel their Chinese citizens and considered how they might do the same in Tacoma. This was one of the earliest recorded instances of Tacoma citizens meeting to discuss taking direct action to expel Chinese residents.

On February 21, 1885, Mayor Weisbach called a mass meeting at the Alpha Opera House to discuss methods of expelling the Chinese population of Tacoma. Roughly 900 of Tacoma's 6,936 total citizens came to the meeting. The crowd was mostly male and white, and the crowd represented nearly half of the town's electorate. A former alderman, J. E. Burns, suggested passing sanitation laws to enable the city to evict Chinese residents and burn down Chinese homes. Reverend J. A. Ward suggested that white property owners cease selling and leasing property to the Chinese community. Weisbach roused the crowd with a closing speech, stating: "If the people are in earnest, if they are Free Americans in fact they will not yield up their homes and business to the filthy horde." The crowd adopted a resolution to exclude Chinese people from Tacoma and discourage citizens from employing any Chinese people. The resolution stipulated that any citizen who did not boycott Chinese employment would have their name published.

Herbert Hunt stated that during 1885, "the discussion of the [Chinese] question was constant and it figured in many business and social affairs." Many groups formed in 1885 in Tacoma with the express goal of expelling the Chinese community. On September 7 of 1885, a Tacoma chapter of the Knights of Labor was formed, which helped to increase hostility against Chinese residents.

The Tacoma City Council also tried to pursue expulsion through legal means, by making residence in Tacoma more difficult for the Chinese community. The council passed an ordinance at the recommendation of Mayor Weisbach stating that all sleeping rooms needed to have 500 cubic feet of air per individual.

On September 28, 1885, an "Anti-Chinese Congress" met in Seattle. Tacoma's Mayor Weisbach presided over the congress, which proclaimed that all Chinese people must leave Western Washington by November 1 of that year. The congress planned for "ouster committees" to notify the Chinese residents in the communities assembled of the expulsion date. A meeting was held at the Alpha Opera House in Tacoma on October 3 to elect the Tacoma "ouster committee," which would later become known as the Committee of Fifteen. Following the meeting, members of this committee alerted members of Tacoma's Chinese community that they had to leave the city by November 1. Other anti-Chinese community members put additional pressure on white Tacomans to fire their Chinese employees.

After this alert, much of the Chinese community left the city, with merchants and some laborers choosing to remain behind. Some members of the Tacoma community gave their assurances to Chinese residents that they would be protected and not forced to leave.

A series of events occurred in the days leading up to the expulsion. On October 31, the night prior to the deadline for the Chinese residents to leave, a final rally was held. Nearly 700 people came to show support for the expulsion. As the November 1st deadline approached, an additional 150 Chinese people left the city, leaving roughly 200 Chinese people in Tacoma. The following day, November 2, those accused in the Squak Valley massacre were acquitted, leading to a feeling that those involved in anti-Chinese actions could act with relative impunity.

== Expulsion and destruction of Chinese community ==
On the morning of November 3 at 9:30 am, 200 to 300 white citizens of Tacoma gathered on Pacific Avenue. The mob had shortly thereafter grown to nearly 500 people. The mob marched from Seventeenth Street to Old Tacoma, stopping at each Chinese residence and business to tell the people within to pack and be ready for a wagon to come at 1:30 PM that day to take them away. They visited the homes and businesses of white citizens who had refused to fire their Chinese employees, delivering their message to them as well. The mob acted methodically and militaristically in their action to expel the Chinese population of Tacoma, and many of the men were armed with either guns or clubs.

The expulsion was often violent. Lum May, a prominent merchant who had been in Tacoma since 1875, reported in a later deposition that the mob "broke forcibly into the houses, smashing in doors and breaking in windows." The wife of Lum May refused to leave and was dragged by members of the mob out of her house. May reported that: "From the excitement, the fright, and the losses we sustained through the riot she lost her reason. She was hopelessly insane and attacked people with a hatchet or any other weapon if not watched...She was perfectly sane before the riot." There were only a few instances of resistance to the actions of the mob. A few Chinese residents sent telegrams to Governor Watson Squire asking for help, but he did not take any action. Some who may have intervened against the action of the mob later reported a hesitance due to the presence of the mayor, judge, multiple members of the city council, and the fire chief in the mob. When Lum May appealed to Mayor Weisbach and noted General John W. Sprague's promise of protection for the Chinese community, Weisbach retorted that "General Sprague has nothing to say. If he says anything we will hang him or kick him."

At 1:30 pm, 150 to 200 members of the Chinese community were rounded up and forced to march 8 miles to the Lake View train station in a torrential downpour. A select number of Chinese merchants were granted a stay of 48 hours to pack up their business, however, for many this was not honored and they were forced to leave with the rest of the Chinese community. Upon arriving at Lake View, the expelled Chinese people were forced to buy their own train tickets to Portland. Those who could not afford tickets rode in the boxcars of a freight train or walked the 140 miles along the rail grade. While waiting for transportation, two men died of exposure.

In the ensuing days, members of the Tacoma community burned down the city's Chinatown. On November 4, three members of the Committee of Fifteen went to inspect Chinese property along the waterfront, and shortly after their departure the buildings were engulfed in flames. No attempts were made by the Tacoma Fire Department to save the buildings. Within four days of the expulsion, all physical memory of Tacoma's Chinese community had been erased by fire.

== Aftermath ==
=== Local aftermath ===
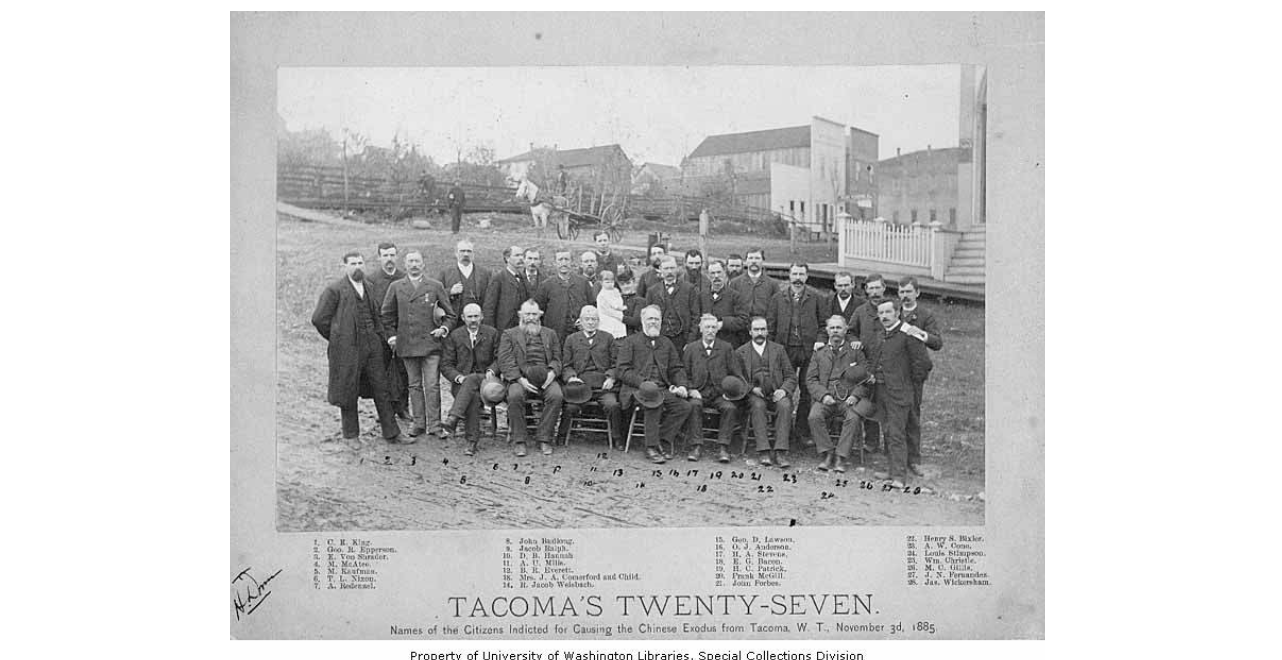
The Tacoma 27 were indicted on felony conspiracy charges related to the Chinese expulsion. None of them were ultimately convicted.

The headline of the Tacoma Daily Ledger on November 4, the day after the expulsion, read: "Gone! Two Hundred Chinese Leave the City – How the People's Request was Enforced." On November 7, a ball was held by Tacoma Turnverein, the city's German society, to celebrate the actions of Mayor Weisbach and the Committee of Fifteen. That same day, Mayor Weisbach, the fire chief, and 25 others who were involved with the expulsion were indicted on felony conspiracy charges. This group would become known as the Tacoma Twenty-Seven. They were escorted to Vancouver, Washington Territory on the morning of November 9. Community members cheered on the 27 as they left, and immediately began raising money for a legal fund. Each member of the Tacoma Twenty-Seven stated that they would plead not guilty. By the 12th, the 27 had posted bail and returned to Tacoma, where they were greeted with much fanfare. The trial of the 27 had been set for the first Monday of April in 1886.

The trial stalled for a year before the original indictments were dropped on a technicality. The United States Attorney immediately presented evidence for a new trial but only 10 of the original 27 were re-indicted. These indictments were also dropped for procedural reasons. Finally, in 1887, the case was brought before a new grand jury, but in the end, no one was indicted. The men involved in the Chinese expulsion had become local heroes and would go on to dominate city politics for years afterwards.

=== US government and Chinese consulate ===
The Chinese consulates in San Francisco and Washington, D.C., were in contact with Washington Territory officials and representatives of the federal government throughout 1885. In September, Frederick Bee, representing San Francisco's Chinese consulate, exchanged messages with Governor Watson Squire over the safety of the territory's Chinese residents. Bee noted that "Complaints are made to this consulate from your Territory that evil-disposed persons have attacked and wounded several Chinese residents, and that further violence is threatened; that, in fact, the Chinese are to be expelled from the Territory." Squire assured Bee that Washington officials would be vigilant about future actions.

Immediately following the expulsion, Chinese consulates in Washington, D.C., and San Francisco pursued legal avenues to ensuring a just resolution. On Yang Ming, the consul general in San Francisco, messaged Secretary of State Thomas F. Bayard and noted that "Several hundred Chinese driven from Tacoma...No effort made by the governor or authorities to protect them. Prompt action must be taken, or the same outrage will be enacted all over the Territory." The Chinese consulate continued to make the argument that the expulsion and related acts of anti-Chinese violence were a direct violation of the Burlingame Treaty.

Chinese officials experienced several challenges in working with the administration of United States President Grover Cleveland. President Cleveland reacted to the growing anti-Chinese sentiments by strengthening the Chinese Exclusion Act of 1882 under the belief that cultural differences and anti-Chinese hostility made the U.S. unsafe for Chinese immigrants. In turn, the Qing government felt that the U.S. was unable or unwilling to protect Chinese citizens living in America. In August 1886, the Chinese foreign office proposed a new Sino-American treaty be drafted with the U.S. State department. On October 1, 1888, Congress passed the Scott Act which permanently banned the immigration or return of Chinese laborers to the United States. The Qing government did not recognize the legitimacy of this act.

President Cleveland, concerned about trade relations with China following the Tacoma expulsion and other cases of anti-Chinese violence in the United States, asked Congress to pass legislation to indemnify the Chinese who suffered from riots in the Pacific states and territories. Congress authorized a payment of $276,619.75 on October 19, 1888, to China as compensation for the Tacoma expulsion and other cases of anti-Chinese violence.

=== National response ===
After the Tacoma expulsion, the Portland, Oregon, newspaper The Oregonian published a piece condemning the actions of Tacoma and comparing the treatment of Chinese in Tacoma to the expulsion of the Jews and Moors from Spain. The Seattle Chronicle echoed the Oregonian's concern of the treatment of the Chinese in Tacoma, and noted that two Chinese residents who were driven out of Tacoma were British citizens who appealed to the British government for redress. The Chronicle also stated that Tacoma would not be so proud of their method once its situation became an international incident. Tacoma received criticism from several newspapers on the East Coast, including The New York Times, New York Herald, New York Sun and New York Tribune. The phrase Tacoma method was coined in the aftermath of the Tacoma expulsion in a piece written by Tacoma resident George Dudley Lawson in California's Overland Monthly. Lawson's piece attempted to justify the expulsion which he viewed as a boon to Tacoma.

== Reconciliation ==
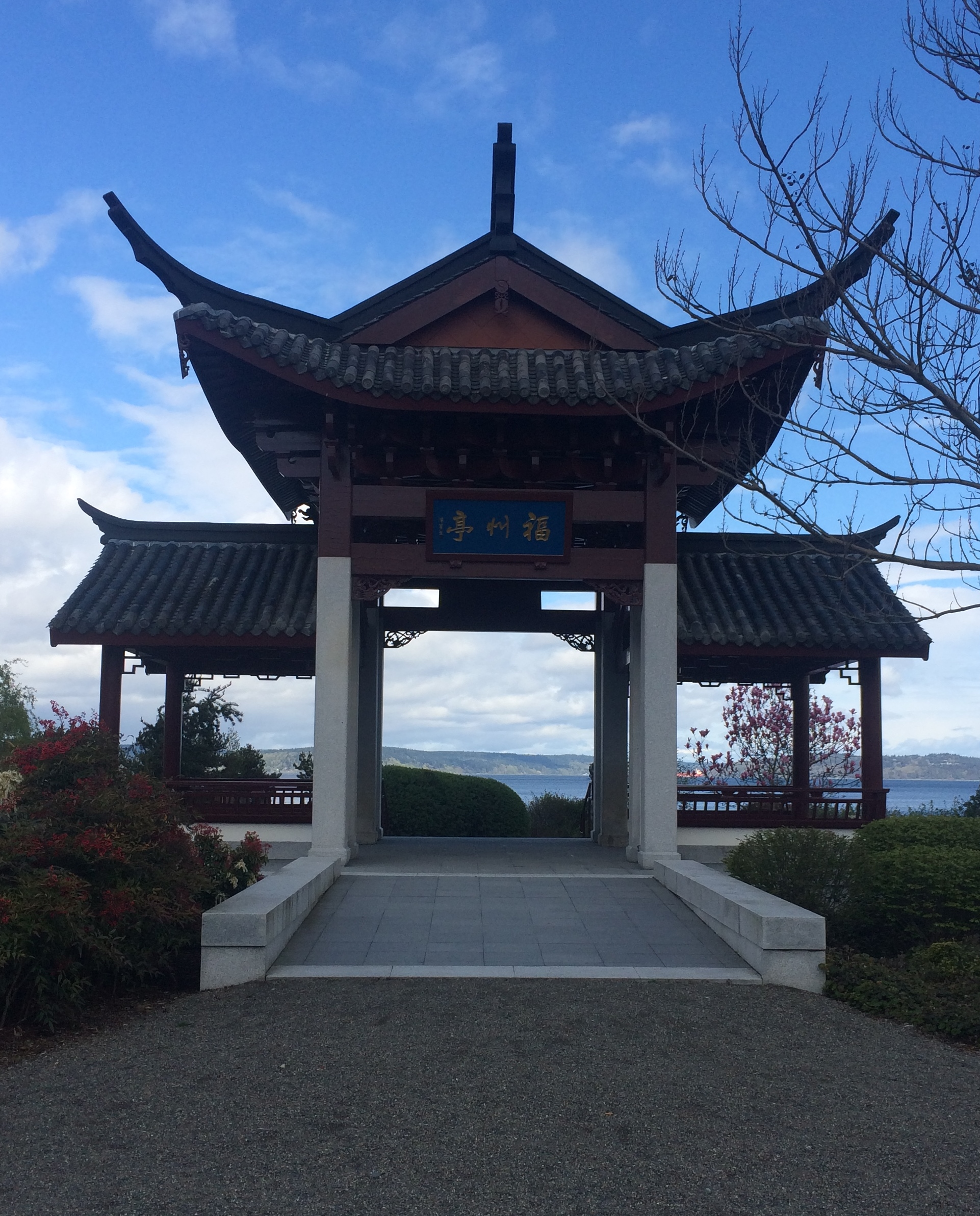
This custom pavilion is one of the centerpieces of Chinese Reconciliation Park in Tacoma, Washington.

Dr. David Murdock moved to Tacoma in 1982 and noticed the lack of Chinese presence in the city. After learning about the 1885 expulsion of Tacoma's Chinese citizens and worried by the lack of recognition of the event, Murdoch submitted a Citizen Suggestion Award Application to the city of Tacoma on August 27, 1991. The statement suggested that "since the eviction [of the Chinese populace] was from the Old Town waterfront, it would be appropriate to set aside an area of reconciliation (small park with a Chinese motif) and a monument acknowledging the incident, noting Tacoma's regret and desire to move ahead in unity and respect."

On November 30, 1993, the Tacoma City Council approved resolution number 32415 in order to formally apologize for the Chinese expulsion of 1885. In doing so, the council recognized efforts of local citizens in promoting reconciliation and endorsed the construction of a Chinese commemorative park which would be located at the former national guard site on Commencement Bay. The city council authorized $25,000 to begin the project, and the Chinese Reconciliation Project Foundation was founded in spring of 1994 in order to continue the process of reconciliation in the Tacoma community. The centerpiece of the foundation has been the construction of Chinese Reconciliation Park, located on the Ruston Way shoreline. The park is very close to the former Chinese settlement of Little Canton, from which residents were expelled in 1885. The park consists of a waterfront trail, the String of Pearls Bridge, and a custom pavilion that was originally constructed in China.

== See also ==
- Chinatown, Tacoma
- Chinese American history
- History of Chinese Americans in the Pacific Northwest
- Anti-Chinese sentiment in the United States
- Chinese Exclusion Act
- Anti-Chinese violence in Oregon
- Anti-Chinese violence in California
- Anti-Chinese violence in Washington
- Chinese massacre of 1871
- San Francisco riot of 1877
- Chinese expulsion from Eureka, 1885
- Rock Springs massacre, 1885
- Attack on Squak Valley Chinese laborers, 1885
- Seattle riot of 1886
- Hells Canyon massacre, 1887
- Pacific Coast Race Riots of 1907
- Bellingham riots of 1907
- Torreón massacre, 1911 in Mexico
- 2021 Atlanta spa shootings
- Tacoma, Washington
- Watson C. Squire
- List of incidents of civil unrest in the United States
