= Anti-Chinese violence in Washington =

There were at least several incidents of anti-Chinese violence in Washington, a United States territory and later, a U.S. state, which occurred during the 19th, 20th and 21st century. In the 19th century, the Chinese Exclusion Act of 1882 created hostile attitudes towards the Chinese people residing in the U.S. The act sparked a wave of anti-Chinese riots and murders occurring in Washington, such as the Tacoma Riot of 1885, the Rock Springs massacre and the Hells Canyon massacre in 1887. There were riots and mob actions in Issaquah (then known as Squak or Squak Valley) and Seattle which resulted in at least four people being killed and extensive property damage. Anti-Chinese violence continued throughout the 20th and 21st centuries, particularly in the wake of the COVID-19 pandemic.

== Chinese Exclusion Act of 1882 ==
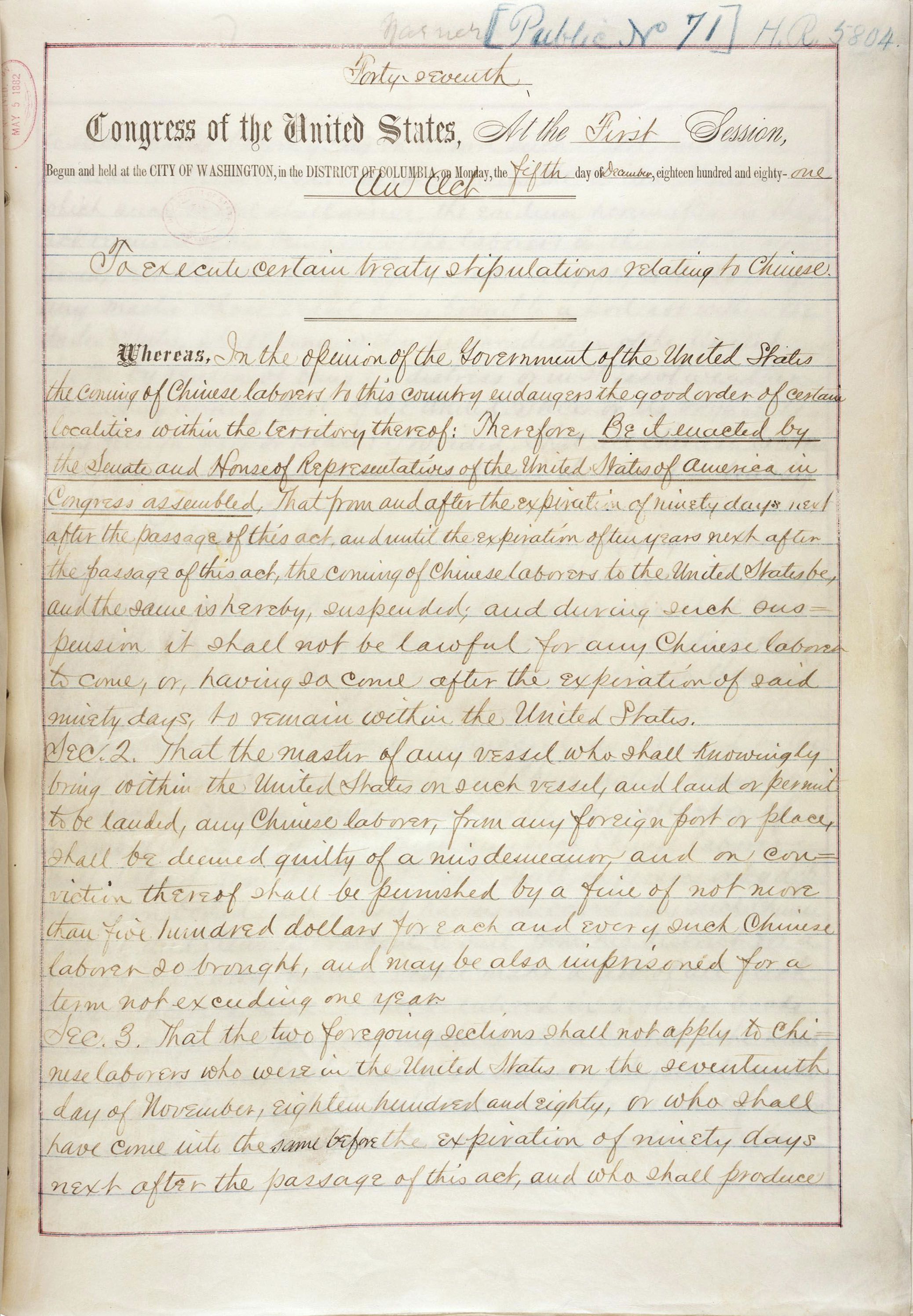
A page from the Chinese Exclusion Act document

The Exclusion Act was enacted by President Chester A. Arthur, on May 6, 1882, in the Supreme Court of the United States, Washington, D.C. The law regulated forced immigration of Chinese laborer's, prohibiting Chinese prostitutes and people who are convicted or still serving their sentences for crimes in their native countries. The government of the United States implemented this act as they feared that Chinese immigrants were outperforming local workers such as European Americans. The act was regarded as the first to prevent all people of a race from immigrating to the U.S.

=== Background ===
Chinese immigration to the United States had a significant increase during the California Gold Rush in 1848. The debt of the Opium Wars (1839–1842, 1856–1860), as well as floods and droughts, caused many Chinese peasants to leave China in the hopes of finding work internationally. The discovery of gold in the Sacramento Valley of California in the United States became a popular area for Chinese immigration. This discovery led to many Chinese people joining the California Gold Rush.

=== Legacy ===
Congress approved the Scott Act (1888) and the Geary Act (1892) to restrict Chinese immigration to the United States. In 1902, Congress made the Chinese Exclusion Act a permanent policy. The "Jim Crow" laws, implemented to marginalize African Americans, also impacted the rights of the Chinese people. This furthered violence towards the Chinese people, lead to the Anti-Chinese Hysteria of 1885–86. The most significant incident of this period was the Rock Springs Massacre in September 1885. The massacre initiated further violence in areas such as Seattle, Tacoma and Washington territory. Congress repealed the Chinese Exclusion Act was repealed by in the 1940s due to the alliance of the U.S. and China during World War II; however, Chinese immigration was restricted to a quota of 105 Chinese per year.

== Violence in the 19th century ==
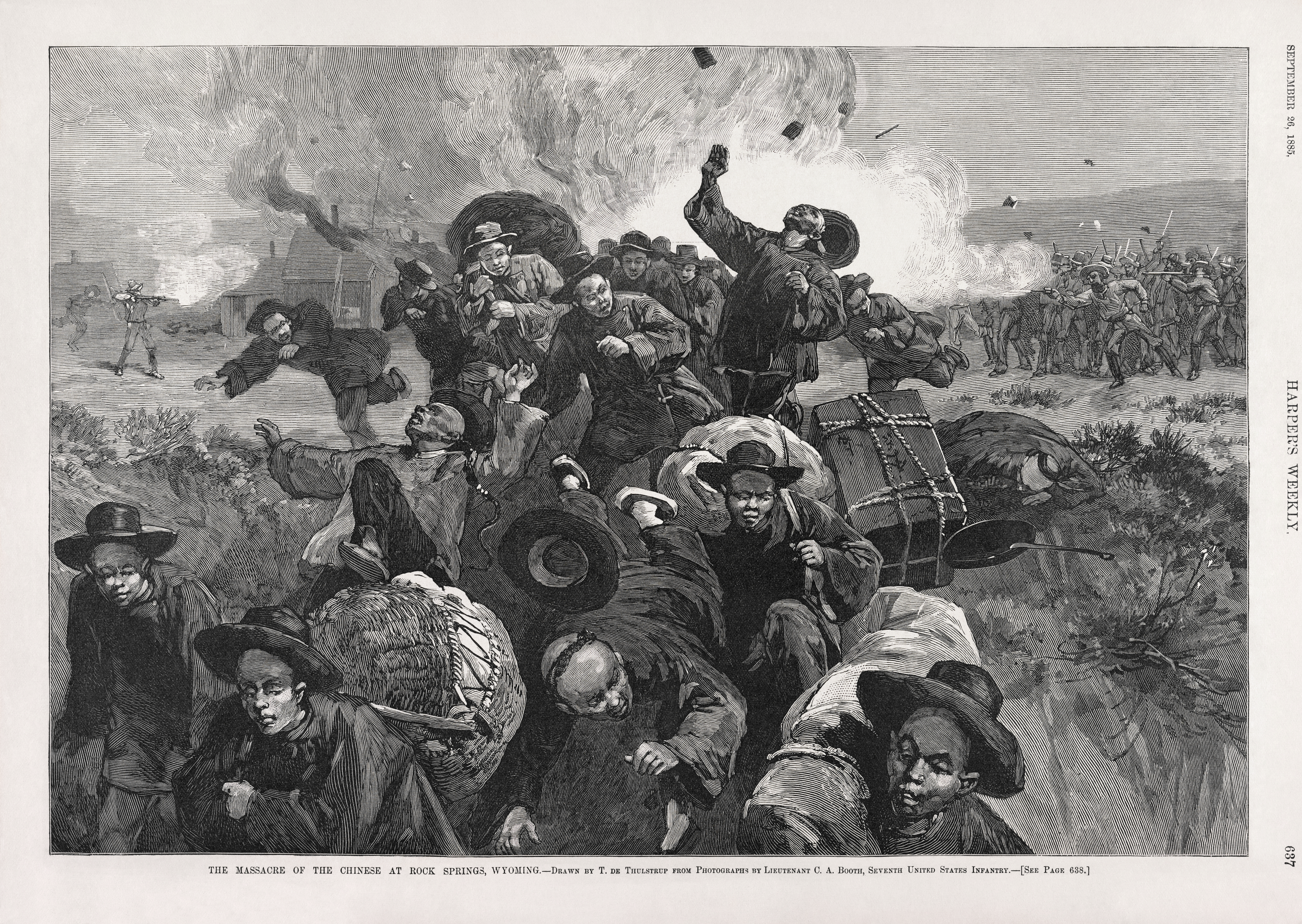
An artist's rendition of the Rock Springs massacre

=== Rock Springs massacre ===
On September 2, 1885, 150 white miners coordinated an attack on the Chinese miners in Rock Springs in Sweetwater County, Wyoming. The attack killed 28 Chinese men and wounded 15 others. The white miners tried to advocate for better working conditions under the Knights of Labor and were ignored by the Union Pacific Railroad. The men blamed the Chinese workers for the Union Pacific Railroad not listening to their demands and blamed the company for allowing the Chinese miners to work in established coal seams. To show resistance to the company's decision, the white miners initiated the riot to drive the Chinese people out of Rock Springs. The following day on September 3, 1885, all 500 Chinese miners in Rock Springs were driven out and 79 homes were set on fire.

==== Background ====
Chinese immigration to Rock Springs began in 1870. The Chinese workers were employed by the Union Pacific Railroad and were considered to be cheap labor. By 1885, there were approximately 600 Chinese workers and 300 white workers. The white population were situated in downtown Rock Springs, whereas the Chinese people lived northeast of the town, which came to be known as "Chinatown".

Due to the Chinese workers being used as cheap labor, the Union Pacific Railroad lowered the earnings of all employees regardless of race. Under the union, the Knights of Labor, the white workers requested for higher wages and better working conditions. The Chinese workers were asked by the union to join them in striking, however they refused. In retaliation, the white workers formed an organization called "Whiteman's Town" in 1883 to expel the Chinese population from the Wyoming territory.

==== Aftermath ====
On September 7, 1885, 22 white miners were arrested for their crimes against the Chinese miners and 45 were fired by the Union Pacific. However, in October 1885, no indictments were found against them. A week later, following the initial riot, on September 9, U.S. military troops escorted the Chinese people who fled back into the town to return to their houses and workplaces. In an attempt to reconcile with the Chinese community of Rock Springs, President Grover Cleveland ordered Congress to pay $147,000 to the residents for the loss of their property.

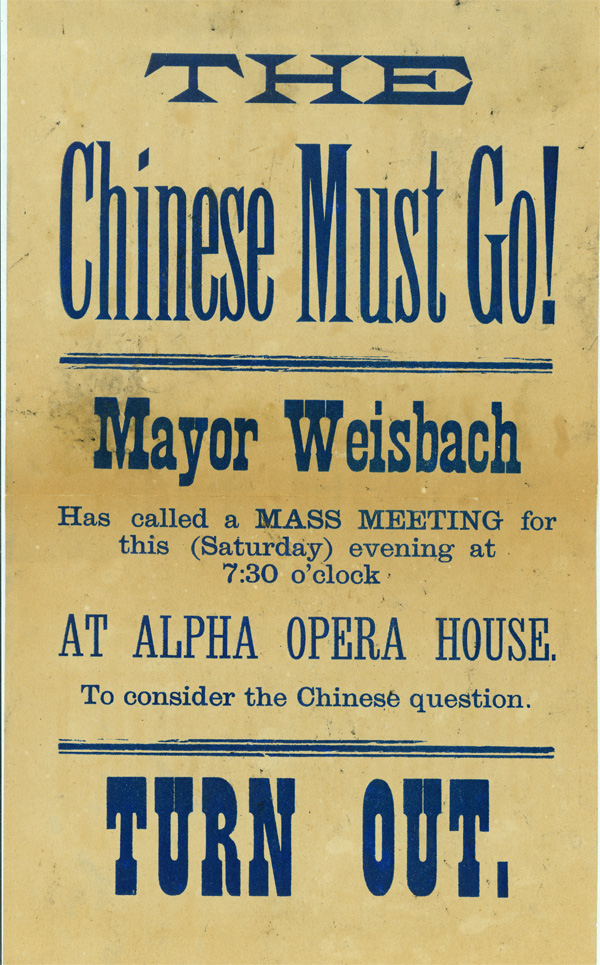
Mayor Weisbach initiated a poster to alert people to a meeting to remove the Chinese people from Tacoma.

=== Tacoma Riot of 1885 ===
The Tacoma Riot of 1885 took place on November 3, 1885, and saw the deliberate removal of the Chinese people from Tacoma, Washington. On November 1, 1885, the anti-Chinese organization led by Mayor Jacob Weisbach issued a deadline for all 700 Chinese men and women to leave Tacoma. Approximately 150 people left before the deadline. On the morning of November 3, the vigilante group led by 500 of the Committee of Fifteen attacked and removed Chinese workers from homes and workplaces. Three days later, two Chinese settlements, including approximately 35 Chinese businesses and homes, were burned. After these events, no Chinese people remained in the city.

On February 21, 1885, Mayor Jacob Weisbach ordered a meeting of 900 citizens to discuss ways to expel the Chinese population of Tacoma. Many other groups such as business owners and laborers gathered in the city to express their desire to expel the Chinese community which included a reading of a chapter of the Knights of Labor. A popular slogan used to recruit people to the Knights of Labor was "the Chinese must go". Despite the widespread hostility towards the Chinese population of Tacoma from community notables and the media, a few leaders spoke out against the force and violence aimed at the Chinese and advocated for tolerance. The most significant of these figures was U.S. Attorney William H. White, who, after the riot, charged 27 people involved in the riot to deprive the Chinese of equal protection of the laws. The most notable of these people included Mayor Weisbach, Probate Judge James Wickersham and Fire Department Chief Jacob Ralph.

==== Legacy ====
Dr David Murdock, in his submission of the Citizen Suggestion Award Program to the City of Tacoma on August 22, 1991, suggested that "since the eviction [of the Chinese populace] was from the Old Town waterfront, it would be appropriate to set aside an area of reconciliation (small park with a Chinese motif) and a monument acknowledging the incident, noting Tacoma's regret and desire to move ahead in unity and respect." On November 30, 1993, the Tacoma City Council passed Resolution No. 32415 to recognize and reconcile the expulsion of the Chinese people of Tacoma in 1885. This decision led to the creation of the Chinese Reconciliation Park, located off Schuster Parkway, Tacoma, Washington. The park stands a hundred feet from a former lumber mill where Chinese workers were situated in 1885 and within a half-mile of a former Chinese settlement called Little Canton.

=== Seattle riot of 1886 ===
The Seattle Riot of 1886 took place on February 7, 1886, in Seattle, Washington, United States. A meeting took place on February 6, 1886, at Bijou Theater, to organize the expulsion of the Chinese residents from Seattle. The following morning groups of five entered the homes of the Chinese residents, under the reasoning of investigating city health regulations. The mob evicted 350 Chinese residents from their homes and attempted to expel them from Seattle via steamships and trains. The Seattle Home Guard protected the Chinese people by holding back the mob; however, the next day, the violence continued and left four rioters wounded and one dead. The court passed an order to stop a steamship from forcibly transporting 97 Chinese; however, despite the orders' efforts, the following day, 196 Chinese left by ship, and another 110 left the following week. Watson Squires, the territorial governor, called for martial law for two weeks. By February 10, President Grover Cleveland ordered federal troops to Seattle to remain for the following months.

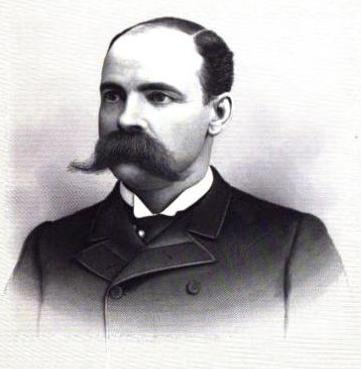
A photograph of John McGraw

==== Background ====
Chinese residents first came to Seattle to be employed as cooks, domestic servants and laborers. The relationship between the Chinese and the white residents began to be affected during the economic slump of the 1880s. The Chinese were seen as competitors for jobs and blamed them for the lack of workers' rights, such as low wages. The Knights of Labor slogan, "the Chinese must go," was used within Seattle amongst labourers and politicians. By 1885, there were 950 Chinese residents in Seattle, forming 10 per cent of the city's population. Some business leaders were openly against the violence and protected the Chinese workers with the aid of federal troops. Two of the members of this group were Judge Thomas Burke and Mayor Henry Yesler, who, on November 5, 1885, delivered a speech to a crowd of 700 at the Seattle Opera House. In attendance were the Knights of Labor, who organized an anti-Chinese mass meeting that day. Burke opposed force and violence and urged the men to respect the law and treaties to protect the Chinese. However, he was hissed at and booed by the crowd. Additionally, Mayor Yesler and Sheriff John McGraw acted to maintain order and called upon the governor for military assistance.

==== Aftermath ====
Following the incident in 1885, a grand jury indicated 15 leaders of the militant anti-Chinese group on conspiracy charges. These leaders included Daniel Cronin, the Knights of Labor organizer; Mary Kenworthy, a socialist leader; and George V. Smith, lawyer and community organizer. The leaders were found not guilty by the jury. Among those arrested in February 1886 by martial law authority for leading the agitation were the Chief of Police William Murphy, W.H. Pinckney, a policeman, Junius Rochester and George V. Smith. None of those arrested were convicted.

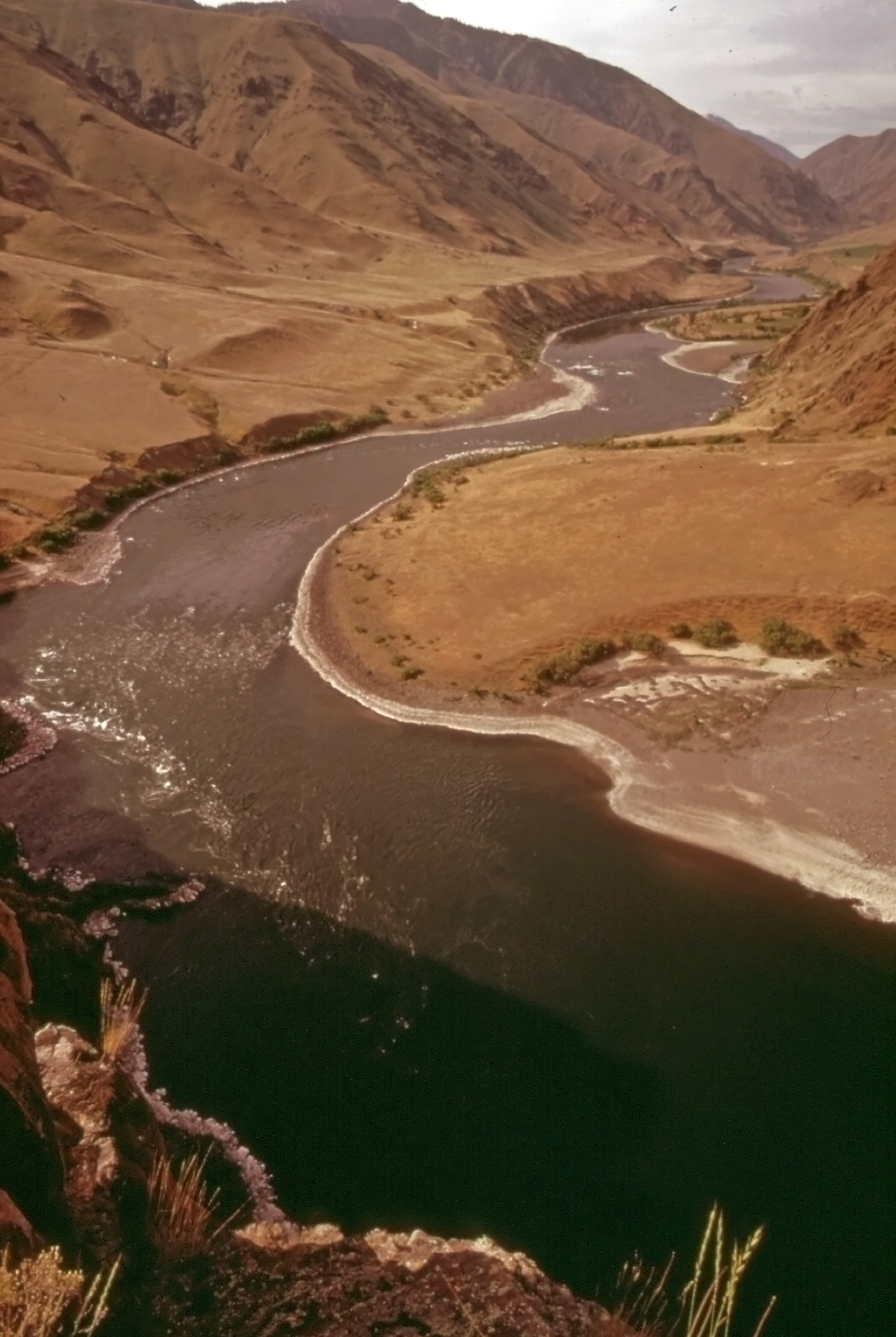
A photograph of the landscape of Hells Canyon

=== Hells Canyon Massacre ===
The Hells Canyon Massacre (also known as the Snake River Massacre) took place on May 25, 1887, in Hells Canyon, on the edge of eastern Oregon and eastern Washington. The massacre involved the ambush, robbing and murder of 34 Chinese gold miners by seven white horse gang members. The bodies of the Chinese gold miners were brutally mutilated and dumped in the Snake River. Their bodies were found approximately a month later by other miners and reported to Lewiston authorities. The estimated amount of gold stolen was between $4,000 to $50,000.

==== Aftermath ====
A gang member, Frank Vaughn, confessed to the crime in April 1888. He revealed the involvement of Bruce Evans, Charley Canfield and C.O. LaRue, which led to their arrest on March 23, 1888. He also stated that the three other convicted members, Robert McMillan, Carl Hughes and Hiram Maynard, were not involved, and they pleaded not guilty on September 1, 1888. A local rancher, George Craig, who had discovered a portion of the miner's bodies, later stated that "if they had killed 31 white men, something would have been done about it, but none of the juries knew the Chinamen or cared much about it, so they turned the men loose."

==== Legacy ====
To commemorate and memorialize the Hells Canyon Massacre of 1887, Richard Nokes and the Chinese Massacre Memorial Committee organized to have a helicopter deliver a 4-by-5-foot granite monument for a ceremony on June 21 and June 22, 2012, to commemorate the death of the 34 Chinese miners. The monument was engraved in English, Chinese and Nez Perce.

== Violence in the 21st century ==
=== COVID-19 pandemic ===
The COVID-19 pandemic in Washington saw the rising of anti-Chinese and anti-Asian hate crimes across the United States, including the Pacific Northwest. In 2019 the King County Prosecutor's Office took 39 hate crimes to court; this number grew to 59 in 2020. The office stated that the increase was because of the rise in attacks on Asians and Asian-Americans.

In April 2020, three men targeted businesses within Seattle's Chinatown-International District with nationalist and racist stickers. The Seattle Police Department stated that this incident was one of 14 anti-Asian hate crimes in 2020; the number of anti-Asian hate crimes recorded in Seattle had grown from nine in 2019 and six in 2018.

== See also ==
- Chinese American history
- Chinese Exclusion Act of 1882
- Scott Act, 1888 & Geary Act, 1892
- Anti-Chinese violence in Oregon
- Anti-Chinese violence in California
- Chinese massacre of 1871
- San Francisco riot of 1877
- Rock Springs massacre, 1885
- Attack on Squak Valley Chinese laborers, 1885
- Tacoma riot of 1885
- Seattle riot of 1886
- Hells Canyon massacre, 1887
- Bellingham riots of 1907
- Torreón massacre, 1911 in Mexico
- 2021 Atlanta spa shootings
