= Anti-Chinese violence in California =

Violence against Chinese-American communities in 19th century California, America

Anti-Chinese violence in California includes a number of massacres, riots, expulsions and other violent actions that were directed at Chinese American communities in the 19th century. The attacks on Chinese were often sparked by labor disputes. In the 1880s alone, Chinese communities were attacked in 34 towns in California, often resulting in the local Chinatown being looted and burned.

== Background ==
=== Growth of California ===
California was annexed by the United States from Mexico after the Mexican–American War in 1848. At the same time the California Gold Rush brought hundreds of thousands of settlers from the Eastern U.S. in search of gold, allowing California to become a state in 1850. The United States saw its first major wave of Chinese immigrants as a result of the gold rush. Most of these immigrants entered the country through the port of San Francisco and by 1860 Chinese immigrants had settled in all but 5 of California's counties.

=== Labor issues ===
The Chinese quickly took up work in many industries after arriving in California. The Chinese faced racial discrimination from white workers who perceived them as being more willing to work for lower wages. Chinese immigrants began to be known as "coolies". Additionally many anti-Chinese labor unions such as the Knights of Labor were created.

== Violence against the Chinese ==
The violence against the Chinese started soon after they began arriving in California in significant numbers. One of the earliest known instances occurred in 1856 when white miners destroyed property in Yreka's Chinatown. The Chinese also faced restricted rights in California as few of them spoke English or were U.S. citizens and were forced to live in segregated communities.

=== 1870s ===
Anti-Chinese violence became more prevalent and severe in California in the 1870s, partly as a result of the Long Depression, which many white Californian workers blamed on industrialists using cheaper Chinese labor.

On October 24, 1871, the most deadly act of violence against the Chinese in California occurred. Around 500 white and Hispanic men attacked Los Angeles' Chinatown after a white civilian was shot to death by a Chinese man. The mob looted Chinatown and lynched nineteen Chinese civilians, all of them male immigrants. Eight suspects were convicted of manslaughter but later had their convictions overturned. San Francisco, which had the largest Chinese population in the country, was also hit by a major anti-Chinese riot in 1877. On July 23, 1877, unemployed white workers gathered for a socialist meeting and began attacking Chinese immigrants, killing four, as they blamed them for their economic woes.

At the same time, anti-Chinese violence was spreading to smaller cities such as Chico, Weaverville, and Yreka. In June 1876, two cabins housing Chinese woodcutters were set on fire during the night in Truckee; after emerging to fight the flames, one woodcutter was shot and killed. The widely-reported incident, known as the Trout Creek Outrage, resulted in seven men being arrested and charged with murder and arson, but the jury found one defendant not guilty of murder after nine minutes of deliberation and the remaining charges were dismissed. In September 1876, the entire Chinese population of Placer County was expelled after a Chinese cook named Ah Sam murdered three white people near Loomis. White gunmen shot and killed four Chinese men in Chico in February 1877 and later unsuccessfully attempted to burn the town's Chinatown to the ground.

=== 1880s ===
Anti-Chinese violence and sentiment in America reached a peak in the 1880s. Congress passed the Chinese Exclusion Act in 1882 which served as a pretext for violent actions against Chinese communities across the American west. Among the most notable of these violent events was the September 1885 massacre of 28 Chinese miners in Rock Springs, Wyoming and the November 1885 expulsion of Chinese Americans from Tacoma, Washington.

On February 6, 1885, Eureka councilman David Kendall was accidentally shot and killed by a Chinese man. The shooting served as pretext for expelling all Chinese residents of Humboldt County to San Francisco. Del Norte County similarly expelled its Chinese population in January 1886.

1885 and 1886 saw an unprecedented wave of violence against Chinese Americans in California. Arroyo Grande, Marysville, Merced, Nicolaus, Pasadena, Redding, Red Bluff, Riverside, Truckee and Tulare all expelled their Chinese populations in those years. The Truckee expulsion was particularly brutal. White residents had previously attempted to expel the Chinese population of Truckee in 1875, 1876 and 1878 but failed each time. In early 1886, white residents began boycotting local merchants who sold any goods to Chinese people. Every single business in Truckee quickly stopped selling any supplies to the Chinese and most Chinese residents left. A few remained, but the remaining buildings in Chinatown were burnt to the ground, resulting in three deaths.

Anti-Chinese violence continued into 1887, with arsonists targeting a number of Chinatowns across California, including those of Chico, Fresno, and San Jose.

As a result of anti-Chinese laws and violence in the 1880s, California's Chinese population declined by 37%. The Chinese had been 8.7% of California's population as of the 1880 census.

=== 1890s ===
Anti-Chinese violence continued into the 1890s. In 1892 the Geary Act, named after California representative Thomas J. Geary, extended the Chinese exclusion act and added new restrictions on Chinese, such as requiring them to carry a resident permit at all times. 1893 saw a wave of anti Chinese riots in California, partly because of an increase in unemployment due to the Panic of 1893. Fresno and Riverside both expelled their Chinese populations that year and a large riot against the Chinese occurred in Redlands.

== Government response ==
In response to rising anti-Chinese sentiment in California and other Western states, the U.S. enacted the Chinese Exclusion Act in 1882 to ban Chinese immigration to the U.S. for 10 years and later enacted the Scott Act in 1888 to prohibit Chinese laborers from re-entering America. The passage of both laws lead to mass celebratory demonstrations in California.

== See also ==
- History of Chinese Americans
- Stop Asian Hate
- Chinese Exclusion Act of 1882
- Scott Act
- Geary Act
- California Alien Land Law of 1913
- Anti-Chinese sentiment in the United States
- Anti-Chinese violence in Oregon
- Anti-Chinese violence in Washington
- Los Angeles Chinese massacre of 1871
- San Francisco riot of 1877
- Rock Springs massacre, 1885
- Attack on Squak Valley Chinese laborers, 1885
- Tacoma riot of 1885
- Seattle riot of 1886
- Hells Canyon Massacre, 1887
- Torreón massacre, 1911, in Mexico
- 2021 Atlanta spa shootings
