= Torreón massacre =

1911 killing of Chinese Mexicans and Japanese Mexicans by revolutionary forces in Mexico

- Part of the Mexican Revolution
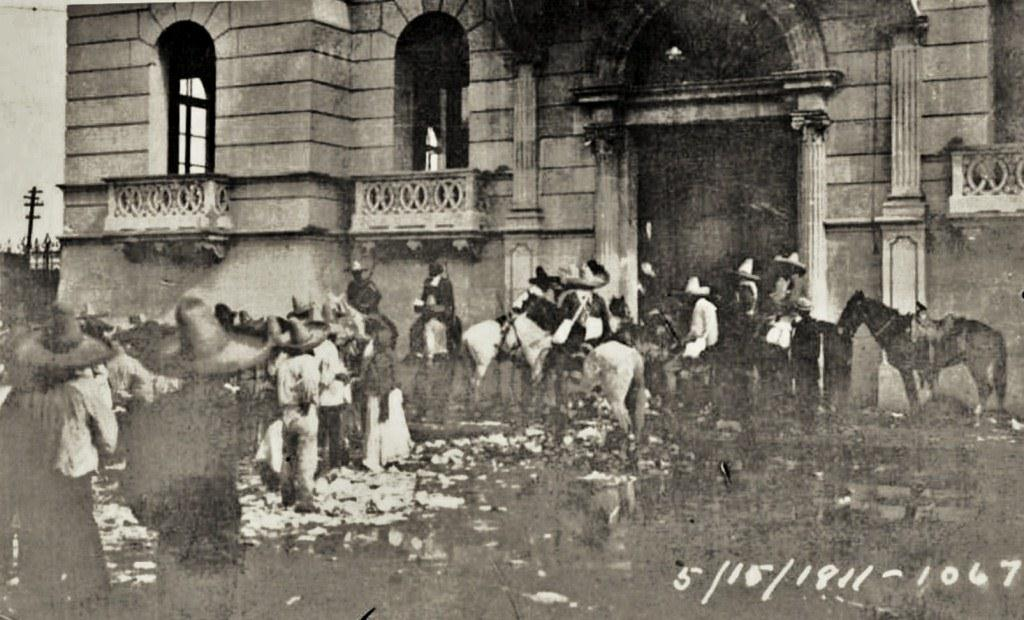
- Mexican forces outside the Casino de la Laguna
- Location: 25°32′22″N 103°26′55″W; Torreón, Coahuila
- Date: 13–15 May 1911
- Target: Asian Mexicans
- Attack type: Massacre
- Deaths: 308 (see Casualties, below)
- Perpetrator: Maderistas
- No. of participants: 4,500
- Motive: Ethnic hatred against Chinese Mexicans and Japanese immigrants

The Torreón massacre (Spanish: Matanza de chinos de Torreón; Chinese: 萊苑慘案) was a massacre that took place from May 13 to May 15, 1911 in the Mexican city of Torreón, Coahuila. A total of 308 Chinese were killed, amounting to half the Chinese community in Torreón. The victims, accused of collusion with dictator Porfirio Díaz, were killed by a local mob and the revolutionary forces of Francisco I. Madero. A large number of Chinese homes and shops were looted and destroyed.

Torreón was the last major city to be taken by the Maderistas during the Mexican Revolution. When the government forces withdrew, the rebels entered the city early in the morning and, along with the local population, began a ten-hour massacre of the Chinese community. The event sparked a diplomatic crisis between China and Mexico, with the former demanding 30 million pesos in reparations. At one point, it was rumored that Qing China had even dispatched a warship to Mexican waters (the cruiser Hai Chi, which was anchored in Cuba at the time). An investigation into the massacre concluded that it was an unprovoked act of racism.

== Background ==
Chinese immigration to Mexico began as early as the 17th century, with a number settling in Mexico City, most of whom originated from Taishan, Guangdong, China. Immigration increased when Mexican president Porfirio Díaz attempted to encourage foreign investment and tourism to boost the country's economy. The two countries signed a Treaty of Amity and Commerce in 1899; over time, the Chinese expatriates began to establish profitable businesses such as wholesale and retail groceries. By 1910, there were 13,200 Chinese immigrants in the country, many living in Baja California, Chihuahua, Coahuila, Sinaloa, Sonora, and Yucatán.

Torreón was an attractive destination for immigrants at the turn of the nineteenth century. It was located at the intersection of two major railroads (the Mexican Central Railway and the Mexican International Railroad) and was proximate to the Nazas River, which irrigated the surrounding area, making it a suitable location for growing cotton. The Chinese likely began to arrive in Torreón during the 1880s or 1890s, at the same time that other immigrants were first recorded as coming to the city. By approximately 1900, 500 of the city's 14,000 residents were Chinese. The Chinese community was easily the largest and most notable group of immigrants in the city. By 1903, it had formed the largest branch of the Baohuanghui (Protect the Emperor Society) in Mexico.

On 17 October 1903, President Porfirio Diaz set up a commission to examine the impact of Chinese immigration to Mexico. The final 121-page report—published in 1911, written by José María Romero—established that Chinese immigration, whether at an individual or group level, was not to the greater benefit of Mexico.

Mexico was one of the countries visited by politician Kang Youwei to fund his Association. He arrived in 1906, and purchased a few blocks of real estate in Torreón for 1,700 pesos, later reselling it to Chinese immigrants for a profit of 3,400 pesos. This investment spurred Kang to have the Association establish a bank in Torreón, which began selling stock and real estate to Chinese businessmen. The bank also built the city's first tram line. Kang visited Torreón again in 1907. It has been suggested that the city served as a test case for Chinese immigration to Mexico and Brazil, which Kang believed might solve overpopulation problems in the Pearl River Delta, Guangdong. Soon there were 600 Chinese living in the city.

In 1907, a number of Mexican businessman gathered to form a chamber of commerce to protect their businesses from the foreigners. Instead of targeting Chinese specifically, they wrote:

We cannot compete against the foreigners in commercial ventures. The sad and lamentable fact is that the prostration of our national commerce has created a situation in which Mexicans are replaced by foreign individuals and companies, which monopolize our commerce and behave in the manner of conquerors in a conquered land.

— El Nuevo Mundo

Tensions and resentment of the Chinese ran high among the Mexican populace of Torreón, stemming from the immigrants' prosperity and monopoly over the grocery trade. Nationwide resentment of the Chinese has also, conversely, been attributed to the fact that the Chinese represented a source of cheap-labor which was central to the Porfirian economic program. Therefore, opposing the Chinese was an indirect way to oppose the dictatorship.

Anti-Chinese sentiments were apparent in the Independence Day speeches and demonstrations of 16 September 1910. Over the next several weeks a number of Chinese establishments were vandalized.

== Events ==
=== Events leading to the massacre ===
On 5 May 1911 (Cinco de Mayo), a revolutionary leader, a bricklayer or stonemason named Jesús C. Flores, made a public speech in nearby Gómez Palacio, Durango, in which he claimed that the Chinese were putting Mexican women out of jobs, had monopolized the gardening and grocery businesses, were accumulating vast amounts of money to send back to China, and were "vying for the affection and companionship of local women." He concluded by demanding that all people of Chinese origin be expelled from Mexico. One witness recalled him stating "that, therefore, it was necessary... even a patriotic duty, to finish with them."

The branch of the reform association in Torreón heard of Flores' speech, and on 12 May the society's secretary, Woo Lam Po (also the manager of the bank) circulated a letter in Chinese among the leaders of the community warning that there could be violence:

Brothers, attention! Attention! This is serious. Many unjust acts have happened during the revolution. Notice have [sic] been received that before 10 o'clock today the revolutionists will unite their forces and attack the city. It is very probable that during the battle a mob will spring up and sack the stores. For this reason, we advise all our people, when the crowds assemble, to close your door and hide yourself and under no circumstances open your places for business or go outside to see the fighting. And if any of your stores are broken into, offer no resistance but allow them to take what they please, since otherwise you might endanger your lives. THIS IS IMPORTANT. After the trouble is over we will try to arrange a settlement.

=== Siege of Torreón ===
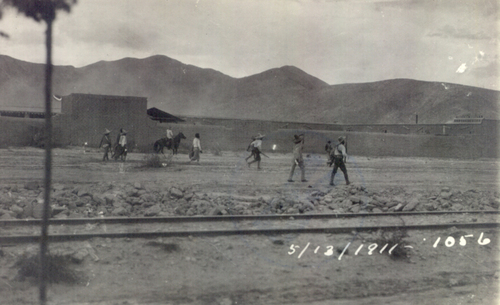
The Maderistas enter Torreón on 13 May

On the morning of Saturday, 13 May, the forces of the Mexican Revolution led by Francisco I. Madero's brother Emilio Madero attacked the city. Its railroads made it a key strategic point necessary to seizing complete control of the surrounding region: it was also the last major city to be targeted by the rebels. Madero and 4,500 Maderistas surrounded the city, hemming in General Emiliano Lojero and his 670 Federales. They overran the Chinese gardens surrounding the city, killing 112 of the people working there. Chinese houses were used as fortifications for the advancing rebels, and the people living there were forced to prepare them food. The fighting continued until the Federales began to run low on munitions on Sunday evening. Lojero ordered a retreat, and his forces abandoned the city under cover of darkness between two and four in the morning on Monday, 15 May, during a heavy rainstorm. The retreat was so sudden that some troops were left behind during the evacuation. Before the rebels entered the city, witnesses reported that xenophobic speeches had been made to incense the accompanying mob against foreigners. Jesús Flores was present, and made a speech calling the Chinese "dangerous competitors" and concluded "that it would be best to exterminate them."

=== Massacre ===
The rebel forces entered the city at six o'clock, accompanied by a mob of over 4,000 men, women, and children from Gómez Palacio Municipality, Viesca Municipality, San Pedro Municipality, Lerdo Municipality, and Matamoros Municipality. They were joined by citizens of Torreón and began the sacking of the business district. The mob released prisoners from jail, looted stores, and attacked people on the street. They soon moved to the Chinese district. Men on horses drove Chinese from the gardens back into town, dragging them by their queues and shooting or trampling those who fell. Men, women, and children were killed indiscriminately when they fell in the way of the mob, and their bodies were robbed and mutilated. It was reported that "[i]n one instance the head of a Chinaman was severed from his body and thrown from the window into the street. In another instance a soldier took a little Chinese boy by the heels and battered his brains out against a lamp post. In many instances ropes were tied to the bodies of the Chinamen and they were dragged through the streets by men on horseback. In another instance a Chinaman was pulled to pieces in the street by horses hitched to his arms and legs." The mob finally reached the bank, where they killed the employees and hurled their severed body parts into the streets. A contemporary newspaper reported that "heads of the murdered Chinese were rolled along the streets, and their bodies were tied to the tails of horses."

A number of residents made attempts to save the Chinese from the mob. Seventy immigrants were saved by a tailor who stood atop the roof of a building where they were hiding and misdirected the mob that was hunting for them. Eleven were saved by Hermina Almaráz, the daughter of a Maderista leader, who told soldiers who wanted to take them from her home "that they could only enter the house over her dead body." Another eight were saved by a second tailor, who stood in the rain in front of the laundry they worked at and lied to the rebels about their presence.

Ten hours after the massacre had begun, at around four o'clock, Emilio Madero arrived in Torreón on horseback and issued a proclamation decreeing the death penalty for anyone who killed a Chinese. This ended the massacre.

=== After the massacre ===
Madero collected the surviving Chinese in a building and posted a hand-picked group of soldiers to protect them. Dead Mexicans were buried in the city's cemetery, but the bodies of the slain Chinese were stripped naked and buried together in a trench.

The same day as the massacre, Madero convened a military tribunal to hear testimony about the killings. The tribunal came to the conclusion that the Maderistas had "committed atrocities", but the soldiers defended themselves by asserting that the Chinese had been armed and the massacre was an act of self-defense.

Both the United States Consulate and the local Relief Committee began collecting donations from locals to support the Chinese. Between 17 May and 1 June, Dr. J. Lim and the Relief Committee collected more than $6,000, which they distributed at a rate of $30 per day to provide food and shelter for the survivors.

== Aftermath ==
=== Events following the massacre ===
After the massacre, large numbers of Chinese fled Torreón, with El Imparcial, a daily newspaper in Mexico City, reporting that over 1,000 people were on the move. Chinese began to arrive in Guadalajara seeking passage back to China.

Property stolen from Torreón continued to appear on the black market in San Pedro for several months following the massacre and looting.

=== Casualties ===
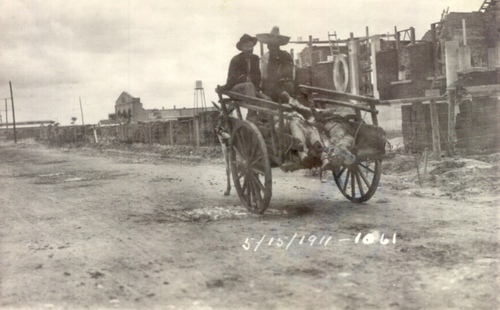
A cart carrying bodies in the aftermath of the slaughter

308 Asians were killed in the massacre; 303 Chinese and 5 Japanese. According to the British Vice Consul in Gómez Palacio, the Japanese were killed "owing to the similarity of features" with the Chinese. It is estimated that the dead made up nearly one-half of the Chinese population.

Among the dead were 50 employees of Sam Wah, both from his estate and his restaurant; Wong Foon Chuck lost 45 employees: 32 from his estate, nine from a railroad hotel that he operated, and four from his laundry; and Ma Due lost 38 out of the 40 workers from his gardens. 25 employees of the bank were also killed.

Rebels, Federales, and bystanders were also killed; according to contemporary reports, these included 25 Federales, 34 bystanders (including 12 Spaniards and a German), and 26 Maderistas. Among the dead was Jesús Flores, apparently killed while attempting to free a machine gun abandoned by the government forces.

=== Property damage ===
One estimate put the total damage at around US$1,000,000 (equivalent to $34,553,571 in 2025). Chinese properties were dealt US$849,928.69 ($29,368,072) in damage. Among the businesses destroyed were the bank, the Chinese Club, 40 groceries, five restaurants, four laundries, 10 vegetable stands and 23 other food stands. Almost 100 Chinese homes and businesses were destroyed in total. Also destroyed were a number of the Chinese-owned gardens outside of town. In addition to businesses and commercial establishments, an unknown number of residential buildings were robbed and destroyed. An American consular agent named G. C. Carothers described the destruction in a 7 June report on the massacre:

Next we went to the Chinese Laundry were four had been killed, and the laundry practically demolished. Bombs had been thrown on the roof, the windows and doors either destroyed or stolen, the machinery broken to pieces and everything that could be carted away, stolen.... The Puerto de Shanghai building was next visited. All of the doors and windows of the building were destroyed. The Chinese Bank, which had been moved into this building a few months before, was demolished, safes blown open and contents taken, furniture destroyed, all papers and valuables stolen.

American, Arabian, German, Spanish, and Turkish establishments were also damaged and destroyed, but in contrast to the Chinese, U.S. properties were only dealt US$22,000 ($760,179 today) in damage.

Other properties destroyed included a casino, the city courthouse, the jail, the police headquarters, the Inferior Court, the Court of Letters, and the Municipal Treasury.

=== Response ===
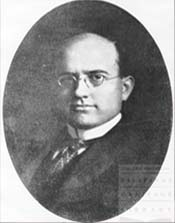
Lebbeus R. Wilfley

A month afterward, the Qing China hired American attorney Lebbeus Wilfley to conduct an investigation into the massacre. Wilfley owned a law firm in Mexico City, and had previously served as the Judge of the United States Court in China. In June he dispatched his partner, Arthur Bassett, to carry out the investigation.

The same month, Qing China demanded reparation from Mexico, seeking a payment 100,000 pesos (in 1911 money) for each Chinese killed during the massacre, a total of over thirty million. Qing China also demanded an official apology from the Mexican government.

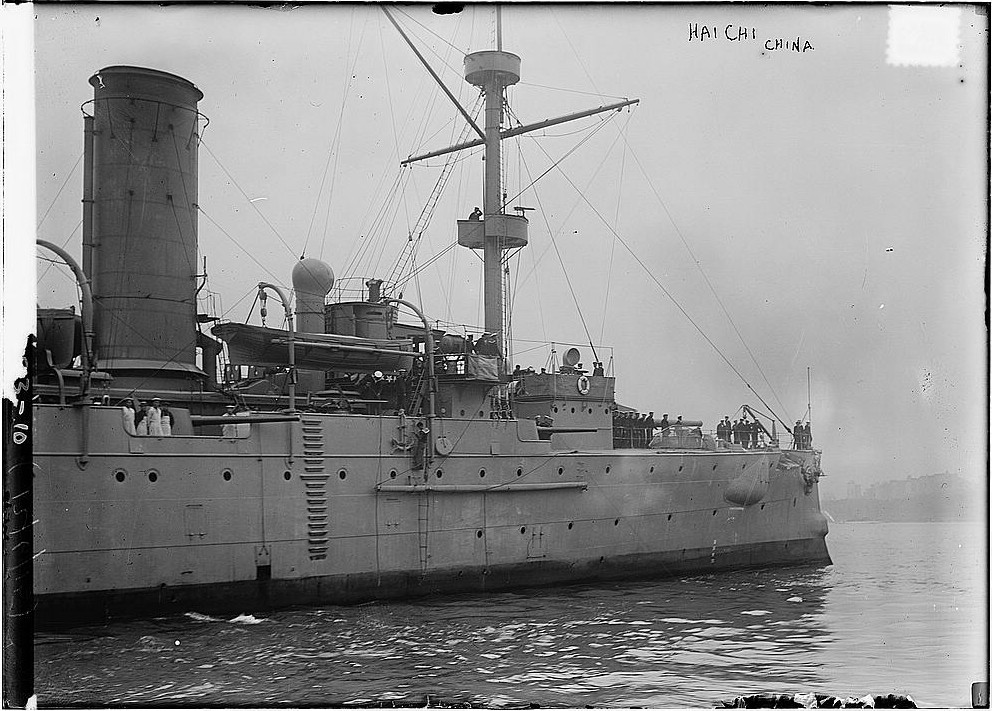
The Hai Chi in 1911

This was followed by a diplomatic crisis, when a rumor began to circulate that Qing China had dispatched a warship carrying investigators to Mexican waters. The U.S. Ambassador to Mexico, Henry Lane Wilson, sent a telegram to Philander C. Knox, the Secretary of State, claiming that the Chinese gunboat Korea was en route for Mexico. Yuan Kwai, a Counselor at the Chinese embassy in the U.S., sought the support of the United States Department of State. He was told that the U.S. would not approve the act, but would not make an attempt to halt it, either. Failing to get support from the U.S., China announced that the rumor was false. Yuan Kwai stated that the cruiser Hai Chi might dock in Mexico after attending the coronation of George V in London. In the event, the Hai Chi docked in Cuba after visiting the United States and halted there while the diplomatic crisis played out, and did not go on to Mexico.

In July, U.S. consul George Carothers reported that a number of foreigners in Torreón had received letters telling them to leave the city.

Madero had ordered that the soldiers culpable for the killings be arrested and put on trial, and by 9 July, 20 of the 35 under suspicion of connection with the massacre had been captured.

Arthur Bassett made his report to Chang Yin Tang, the Chinese Minister to Mexico, on 13 July, after conducting interviews with a number of Chinese and Mexican witnesses to the massacre. He concluded that the Maderistas' claims (that they had been fired on by the Chinese) were false, citing the 12 May circular by the reform society. He also dismissed the claim that the immigrants had been armed by General Lojero and his retreating Federales, pointing out that the reason for the evacuation was a dearth of ammunition. Furthermore, no witnesses reported any form of resistance by the Chinese. In his report, he called the incident "an unprovoked massacre... conceived in malice and race hatred" and concluded that it was a clear violation of the 1899 treaty between the two countries.

Bassett, in collaboration with Owang King (a representative for China) and Antonio Ramos Pedrueza (representing Mexican President Francisco León de la Barra), tendered a second report to Chang on 28 August, once again attempting to assess whether the Chinese themselves had prompted the massacre by resisting the Madistera troops. The editor of Diogenes, a local paper, stated that Lojero had "authorized him to deny all allegations" that he may have armed the Chinese. Upon further inquiry, the owners of local stores testified that they had not sold weapons to Chinese patrons before the massacre. The report concluded:

The contention that the Chinese offered resistance is pure fabrication, invented by the officers of the revolutionary army for the sole purpose of escaping the punishment which the commission of such a heinous crime would naturally entail upon them.

After failing to gain support from the United States, Qing China reduced the demanded indemnity from thirty million to six million. However, it continued to demand an official apology, a guarantee of the safety of Chinese citizens in Mexico, and the punishment of the soldiers responsible for the massacre.

As the 1911 Mexican Independence Day approached, the foreign community in Torreón became restless, remembering the violence that had broken out at that time the previous year. To prevent another outbreak of violence, Francisco Madero sent 1,000 troops to the city.

Qing China was overthrown in the Xinhai Revolution. Its successor, the Republic of China (ROC) came to an agreement with Mexico in November 1912, and a treaty was signed wherein Mexico granted 3,100,000 pesos in damages to ROC and extended an official apology. The deadline for payment was later extended to 15 February 1913. However, after the February 1913 assassination of Francisco Madero, Mexico entered a period of economic collapse. They proposed to pay ROC in bonds. The Dutch ambassador warned against it, believing that Mexico would be unable to obtain the foreign loans necessary for payment.

The Mexican Senate debated a number of ways to pay the indemnity through 1912 and 1913, including considering payment in silver. However, the bonds were never approved, and reparation was never made.

In 2021, 110 years later, then-president of Mexico López Obrador apologized for his country's role in massacre.

=== Further unrest ===
The massacre in Torreón was not the only instance of race violence against the Chinese during the revolution. In the first year alone, rebels and other Mexican citizens contributed to the deaths of some 324 Chinese. By 1919, another 129 had been killed in Mexico City, and 373 in Piedras Negras. The persecution and violence against the Chinese in Mexico finally culminated in 1931, with the expulsion of the remaining Chinese from Sonora.

== See also ==
- Chinese Mexican
- Chinese Exclusion Act
- Anti-Chinese violence in Oregon
- Anti-Chinese violence in California
- Anti-Chinese violence in Washington
- Chinese Massacre of 1871 (Los Angeles)
- San Francisco riot of 1877
- Rock Springs massacre, 1885
- Attack on Squak Valley Chinese laborers, 1885
- Tacoma riot of 1885
- Seattle riot of 1886
- Hells Canyon massacre, 1887
- 2021 Atlanta spa shootings
- List of massacres in Mexico
- List of ethnic riots
