= Chinatown, Tacoma, Washington =

Tacoma Chinatown
- Neighborhood of Tacoma
- Interactive map of Tacoma Chinatown
- Coordinates: 47°14′29″N 122°27′34″W
- Country: United States
- State: Washington
- County: PIerce County
- City: Tacoma, Washington
- ZIP Code: 98409
- Area code: 253

The U.S. city of Tacoma, Washington, was once home to a significant historic Chinatown. It was located in Downtown Tacoma near Railroad Street according to a historical record.

== History ==
In November 1885 disgruntled whites drove out the Chinese population and burned down Chinatown. According to a historical account, many who were driven out fled to Portland, Oregon or Canada. Two days after the Chinese were driven out, Tacoma's Chinatown was burned to the ground. According to another source, as many as six hundred Chinese were dragged out to the street in a raid and escorted to the train station. According to the article "Tacoma Chinese Riots" published by the Tacoma News Tribune, most of the Chinese had arrived at Tacoma looking for labor because the Pacific Railways had been completed and the gold rush era was taking place. In the book "A Narrative of Early Tacoma and the Southern Sound" it explains how after the completion of the Northern Pacific main line the Chinese would flood cities like Tacoma and would have negative impacts on American household incomes. The high population of Chinese labor would drive the wages of Americans down because the Chinese would work harder and for longer periods.

Not only did the Chinese worry about the unemployed Americans they also had to worry about the employed Americans. In the article "Investigating the causes of the Recent Riot" American miners would discuss how unfairly they were being treated in comparison to the Chinese. The Chinese were given the best mining rooms to work in and the mining bosses would use false weights when it came to paying Americans. It was argued that the Chinese had to pay a fee in order receive these benefits. Because of this and many other reasons, Americans wanted to drive out the Chinese from Tacoma. One of America's first Labor Union known as The Noble and Holy Order of the Knights of Labor had gathered many business owners with the Mayor of Tacoma to orchestrate the expulsion of the Chinese.

In the thesis of Robert Mack, it states that the Chinese expulsion was able to happen without interference from local law enforcement for many reasons. The government didn't want to cause violence, individuals who were against the expulsion stopped supporting the Chinese and the people who orchestrated the expulsion had a lot of power.

== Memorials ==
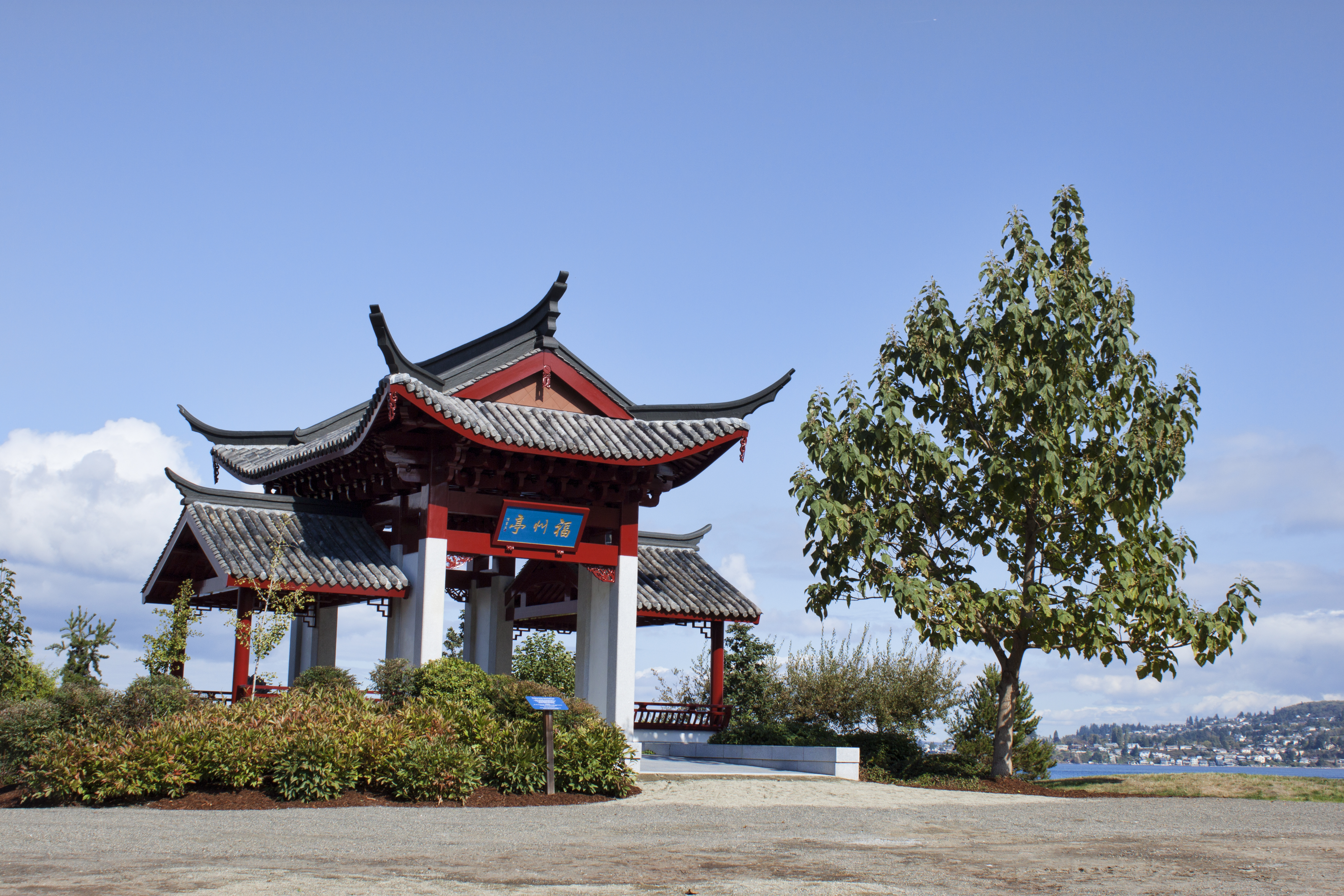
Fuzhou Ting at Chinese Reconciliation Park

Recently, a special remembrance garden called the Chinese Reconciliation Park has been built a short distance away. In 2016, the carved granite lion statues located near the Fuzhou Ting pavilion were vandalized when their mouths were smashed and the carved granite balls located inside their mouths were removed.
