= George W. Tibbetts =

American businessman (1845–1924)

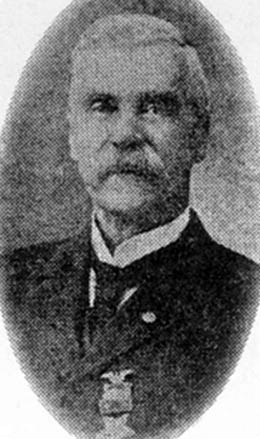
George W. Tibbetts was a prominent Washington business leader.

George W. Tibbetts (January 22, 1845 – March 8, 1924) was a merchant and hops farmer in Washington during the mid-to-late 19th century. He was known as a critic of Chinese labor being used in place of white labor. He was involved in an 1885 incident in Squak Valley in which three Chinese laborers were murdered and three others wounded.

== 1885 Squak Valley attack ==
Tibbetts served as Justice of the Peace in Squak, Washington, which is present day Issaquah, about 15 miles east of Seattle. In 1885 he also had several businesses, which included a dairy farm, a stage line, and growing hops. A neighboring hops farm run by Norwegian immigrants Lars and Ingebright Wold had hired several dozen Chinese men from Seattle to harvest their crop.

On September 6, 1885, when Tibbetts learned of the laborers, he visited the Wold farm and demanded that the Chinese workers be sent away. The Wold's refused. Tibbetts returned later in the evening with about 30 armed men on horseback and demanded again that the Wolds stop using the Chinese workers. Again the Wolds refused but said the Chinese would be sent back when the harvest was complete.

The following night, September 7, 1885, a group of white men and two Indians attacked the camp where the Chinese men were staying. Three Chinese men were shot to death and three others badly wounded. The other Chinese workers then fled the area, eventually returning to Seattle.

In the morning, as Justice of the Peace, Tibbetts performed an investigation, but concluded that the Chinese men had died of gunshot wounds from "the hands of unknown persons" King County officials later arrived from Seattle and performed their own investigation, arresting seven men for murder, however none were ever convicted. A grand jury separately indicted Tibbetts for murder and "riot", and he spent a month in jail but was then released without being tried.

== Tibbetts in the lodges ==
Before the violence of 1885 Tibbetts helped found multiple lodges around the region. In October 1874 he helped charter one of the King County's earliest Patrons of Husbandry lodges. Later, after the violence at Squak, he chartered several other lodges in the Issaquah area. By the time it was called Gilman, no longer Squak, Tibbetts was a charter member of the Gilman Odd Fellows Lodge. In 1890 he was an original member of the Knights of Pythias lodge in Issaquah.

== Mercantile work ==
Tibbetts owned several businesses in Issaquah and was a well known merchant. In 1881 he built a large store and a hotel on his farm. The next year he established a stage coach line from Newcastle to Squak and eventually to North Bend. He operated his coach line in conjunction with the Columbia and Puget Sound Railroad.

After the town of Squak/Gilman/Issaquah was platted Tibbetts built a two-story building and moved his business into it. This was Issquah's first mercantile house, it would later be occupied by the Issaquah Coal Company.

In 1878 Tibbetts took over as town Postmaster from William Pickering, who had served since 1870. Tibbetts moved the post office into his store and remained in the position until 1886. In 1888 he, along with Isaac Cooper, Thomas Rowley and William Moore organized the Issaquah Water Company.
