= Seattle shooting =

Seattle shooting may refer to:

- Wah Mee massacre (1983)
- Suicide of Kurt Cobain (1994)
- Capitol Hill massacre (2006)
- Seattle Jewish Federation shooting (2006)
- Murder of Timothy Brenton (2010)
- Seattle café shootings (2012)
- 2026 Seattle Center shooting (2026)
