= 1885 Squak Valley attack =

Attack on Chinese laborers in Washington Territory

Coordinates: 47°32′10.92″N 122°2′28.21″W

On September 7, 1885, in Squak Valley (present-day Issaquah), Washington Territory, United States, a group of men fired guns into several tents where Chinese hop pickers were sleeping. The shootings resulted in the deaths of three Chinese men and the wounding of three others. The attackers were later identified and brought to trial, but all were acquitted.

The murders were part of a widespread pattern of racially motivated violence against Chinese immigrants in the United States at the time. During the latter half of the 19th century, there were more than 150 documented group attacks against Chinese communities and settlers throughout North America.

Some of the details about what happened in Squak Valley have been disputed. There are brief accounts from two of the Chinese victims of the attack and several statements from those who investigated the crime, but otherwise the remaining information comes from statements made by the individuals who were either on trial or awaiting trial for the murder of the Chinese laborers. Several statements made during the trial directly contradicted the accounts of others.

== Undisputed accounts ==
Ingebright and Lars Wold were two brothers who owned a large hop farm in the Squak Valley, about 15 miles east of Seattle, in the 1880s. For several years they had been using local American Indian laborers to pick the hop crop, but in 1885 the market prices for hops were very low. After failing to negotiate lower wages with the Indians, in late August the Wold brothers contracted with the firm of Quong Chong & Company in Seattle to bring Chinese laborers to pick the hops for a reduced rate.

On Saturday afternoon, September 5, 1885, a group of 37 Chinese laborers arrived at the Wold brothers' farm. They pitched their tents in the orchard at the farm. That same night a group of local Squak Valley residents, led by Samuel Robertson and DeWitt Rumsey, visited the Chinese and told them they should leave the valley. They were interrupted by one of the Wold brothers' workers, who persuaded the local men to go see the Wold brothers. The local men, along with George W. Tibbetts, the local Justice of the Peace and prominent merchant, met with the Wold brothers and told them that the Chinese must leave, or else the same men would come back and force them to leave. The Wold brothers told the group to go away and let the Chinese do their work. The group then left and returned to their homes.

On Sunday, September 6, news of the Rock Springs massacre of Chinese miners in Wyoming was on the front page of the Seattle newspaper.

On Monday, September 7, at about 4 o'clock, another group of about 30 Chinese laborers started to enter Squak Valley and were met at George W. Tibbetts' store by a group of white men and Indians. The crowd intimidated the arriving Chinese, who turned around and went back the way they came. There are no known reports of who was in the group of men that turned the Chinese away.

At approximately 10 PM that same day, a group of at least five white men and two Indians went to the Chinese camp on the Wold brothers' farm. Several rounds of shots were fired into the tents of the Chinese workers, and at least six Chinese workers were hit by the gunfire. Two, identified as Fung Woey and Mong Gow, died quickly, and another, identified as Yeng San, died the following morning. The remaining three wounded men—named Gong Heng, Ah Jow and Mun Gee—recovered, although Mun Gee was reported to have more permanent injuries.

King County Sheriff McGraw and King County Coroner L. B. Dawson conducted an investigation of the shooting the next day. The coroner convened an official inquest to look into the matter, and on Tuesday, September 8, a hearing was held. At the hearing, eleven men testified before a jury of six local residents. Those testifying were: Gong Heng, Joseph Day, I. A. Wold, L. A. Wold, Sam Gustin, M. De Witt Rumsey, J. A. Wold, George W. Tibbetts, William A. Wolf, Perry Bayne, and Sam Robertson. Under oath, Robertson admitted taking part in the shooting and named several others who were there with him. The jury found that the Chinese were killed "by gun and pistol wounds initiated by M. DeWitt Rumsey, Joseph Day, Perry Bayne, David Hughes, Samuel Robertson, Indian Curley, Indian Johnny and other persons to us unknown." Two days later a grand jury indicted all of those named by the coroner's jury, except Robertson. The judge gave Robertson immunity in return for his testimony against the others.

District Attorney J. T. Ronald decided to try Bayne first, since he was implicated by Robertson as the leader of those who did the shooting. On October 28, the trial of Bayne started in Seattle. It lasted a full week. The jury returned a verdict of not guilty after deliberating less than one-half hour.

The prosecutor then charged the same seven men, plus Tibbetts, with inciting a riot. Another trial was held in late November, and all of the defendants were found guilty. They were fined $500 each. The defendants appealed their conviction to the territorial supreme court on the grounds that women had been wrongly included on the grand jury that had handed down the indictments. In January 1888, the court agreed with the defendants, saying that the law required all members of grand juries to be qualified voters, and women at that time did not have the right to vote in Washington Territory. All of the convictions were overturned.

== Disputed information ==
The number of people who went to the Chinese camp on Saturday night and on Monday night was stated by various defendants to have been at least seven and as many as twenty. Everyone who testified was uncertain about the number and exactly who was in the group.

At the murder trial, the defendants said that they were just going to tell the Chinese to leave, but when they got to the camp someone in the camp shot at them first. The defendants claimed they returned the fire only in self-defense.

The role of the local Indians in the attack is unclear. Several Indians testified that they were present in the group that went to the camp, and two men, identified as Indian Joe and Indian Curley, were indicted for the murder. During Perry Bayne's trial, at least one person testified that the Indians fled when the shooting started.

Although Sam Robertson first testified against the other defendants, at the trial the defendants said he was the leader and they went along mainly to keep him from harming the Chinese.

Testimony about the number and types of guns supposedly used, and who did or did not use them, varied from person to person.

== See also ==
- Anti-Chinese sentiment in the United States
- Anti-Chinese violence in Washington
- Chinese Exclusion Act
- History of Chinese Americans
- Lynching of Asian Americans
