= Chinese Underground Railroad =

The Chinese Underground Railroad was an imaginary route through the borderland between the United States and Mexico, especially around El Paso, Texas. Because of the 1882 Chinese Exclusion Act, Chinese immigrants, with the help of Chinese laborers living in Mexico and smugglers, would illegally enter the United States in order to bypass the act. Similar to the Underground Railroad that brought African American slaves to free states in the Northern United States and Canada, the Chinese Underground Railroad was not actually a railroad. Additionally, the secret route allowed Chinese immigrants from the end of the 19th century to the beginning of the 20th century enter the United States during a time of discrimination against Chinese people.

== Background ==
When the Chinese Exclusion Act was initially enacted in 1882, it allowed legal means for the Chinese to enter the United States. Those who came to travel, sell, or go to school were allowed to enter during the time of exclusion, and Chinese people already living in the United States were allowed to leave and come back so long as they had the proper certificate. However, when those who opposed Chinese immigration began to view the act as ineffective and ambiguous, violence against the Chinese rose. In order to placate the situation, Congress enacted the Scott Act of 1888, which no longer allowed Chinese workers to enter the United States with ease. After the Scott Act came the Geary Act in 1892, which extended the Chinese Exclusion Act for ten more years and mandated Chinese laborers receive certificates to prove their residence. While the Gresham-Yan Treaty of 1894 did allow Chinese laborers to leave and return to the United States if they had families, property, or debts in the United States, the exclusion law persisted until 1943. In order to get around the Chinese Exclusion Act, Chinese immigrants traveled to the United States through Canada and Latin America.

== The Railroad ==
The Chinese Underground Railroad from Mexico to the United States was not actually a railroad, but it did follow the railroad lines between Sonora and Arizona. The Underground Railroad was found throughout the Mexican–American border, but its most common route was through El Paso. The route smuggled Chinese immigrants, as well as drugs (mainly opium) and diamonds to cities in the United States, such as Los Angeles to Chicago. Anglo-Americans and Chinese immigrants would team up to bring Chinese immigrants to the United States through Mexico. In the early 1900s, smugglers took advantage of the less populated regions in the borderland to bring Chinese immigrants into the United States. Smugglers would begin in Mexican cities such as Salina Cruz, Manzanillo, Mazatlán, and Guaymas and travel through Nogales, Arizona and Nogales Sonora, which were twin border cities, until they reached the United States.

Traveling through the Mexican border could prove to be treacherous. Because it was largely a desert, many Chinese immigrants got lost easily and became weakened by dehydration and lack of food. Chinese immigrants who chose to rely on smugglers could find them untrustworthy - in one example, sixteen Chinese immigrants were killed after first collectively paying their smuggler guides. Today, the Chinese immigrants who suffered and died in the desert are remembered through the names of the desert. The area between San Felipe and the Mexicali-Imperial Valleys is now called El Desierto de los Chinos (the Chinese Desert), and other areas such as Chinaman Flat, El Chinero, and Llano El Chinero, commemorate the immigrant victims.

The Underground Railroad was often supported by Chinese people who lived near the border. Chinese immigrants could move from Real de Castillo to Burro Valley to Yalecites to Carisco thanks to the Chinese who lived in those villages. Those immigrants who successfully reached the American side of the border often continued to help other immigrants pass through the borderlands as well.

One town that continued the Underground Railroad was El Paso Chinatown. One could illegally enter El Paso by going through Ciudad Juárez, where Chinese immigrants learned English. Houses and buildings on the route concealed places for the Chinese immigrants to hide as they moved from one area to another, supported by other Chinese people in the area. However, the town was mostly filled with men who were unable to establish families because Chinese women were not allowed to enter the United States at all because of the Chinese Exclusion Act. Additionally, the Mexican Revolution and the increased enforcing of the Mexican–American border made it more difficult to use the underground railroad. Because of this, the community died in the early 1900s.

== Smuggling ==
Various smugglers also continued the Chinese Underground Railroad. Jim Bennett, along with Lee Quong, Louis Greenwaldt, and B. C. Springstein, all ran this business of getting Chinese immigrants into the United States for over three years. Smugglers would first collect $50 to $200 from Chinese immigrants and help them travel to the United States. The business continued successfully thanks to Bennett's precision in ensuring that his assistants were capable and trustworthy. They would use several concealment methods, such as hiding immigrants in wagons or making the immigrants wear Mexican clothes. The business ended after Chinese inspector Charles Connell found immigrants with faulty certificates that they had received from Springstein. After capturing Springstein and hearing his testimony, Greenwaldt and Bennett were arrested, and Quong, the only Chinese smuggler of the bunch, was deported to China.

It is close to impossible to determine how many Chinese immigrants entered the United States through Mexico with the help of these advanced smuggling businesses. Guamas businessman W. Iberry estimated 20,000, though this could be incorrect. By 1916, the Chinese smuggling business had significantly declined, so that Chinese immigrants began to search for opportunities to live and work in Mexico.

== Sources ==
- Delgado, Grace (2004). "At exclusion's southern gate: changing categories of race and class among Chinese frontizeros, 1882-1904". Continental crossroads: remapping U.S.-Mexican borderlands history. Duke University Press. ISBN 0822333899.
- Delgado, Grace (2013). Making the Chinese Mexican: Global migration, localism, and exclusion in the U.S.-Mexico Borderlands. Stanford University Press. ISBN 9780804783712.
- Ettinger, Patrick (2009). Imaginary Lines. University of Texas Press. ISBN 9780292782082.
- Lee, Erika (2002). "Enforcing the borders: Chinese exclusion along the U.S. Borders with Canada and Mexico, 1882-1924". The Journal of American History. 89 (1): 54–86. doi:10.2307/2700784. JSTOR 2700784.
- Portillo, Jaime; Atilanoc, Joanna (2000). "Chinese immigrants helped build railroad in El Paso". Borderlands. 19.
- Romero, Robert Chao (2010). The Chinese in Mexico, 1882-1940. University of Arizona Press. ISBN 9780816527724. JSTOR j.ctt1814j07.
- Staski, Edward. "China Then and Now". University of New Mexico.
- "Smuggle Chinese by the thousand". The Chicago Daily Tribune. May 29, 1909.
- Warren, Scott; Wan, Yu; Costello, Donna Ruiz y (2015-09-03). "La Chinesca: The Chinese Landscape of the Mexico-U.S. Borderlands". Yearbook of the Association of Pacific Coast Geographers. 77: 62–79. doi:10.1353/pcg.2015.0013. ISSN 1551-3211. S2CID 128398081.
