= Robert Chao Romero =

Robert Chao Romero (born 1972) is a Chinese-Latino American historian and immigration lawyer at UCLA. He is the author of The Chinese in Mexico, 1882-1940, winner of the Latin American Studies Association's Latina/o Studies Section Book Award.

== Biography ==
Romero was the maternal-grandson of the Chinese evangelist Calvin Chao (Zhao Junying, 1906–1996), who Christianity Today called as “the Chinese Billy Graham.” Romero's father was from Chihuahua, Mexico and his mother is from Hubei, China.

He received his Bachelor of Arts in History at UCLA in 1994 and his Juris Doctor at UC Berkeley in 1998, following a Doctor of Philosophy in Latin American History at UCLA in 2003. His first monograph, The Chinese in Mexico, 1882-1940, investigates the history of the Chinese community in Mexico, which receives the Latina/o Studies Section Book Award from the Latin American Studies Association.

He is currently a Professor and Chair of the Department of Chicana/o and Central American Studies at UCLA. His research mainly examines Asian immigration to Latin America. Due to his background as an attorney, he is also interested in immigration law and policy.

He is the co-founder of Jesus 4 Revolutionaries, a Christian ministry to activists, and the co-chair of the Matthew 25 Movement in Southern California. He was ordained in the early 2000s by Faye Newman in South Los Angeles.

== Selected works ==
- Brown Church: Five Centuries of Latina/o Social Justice, Theology, and Identity. Grand Rapid:IVP, 2020. ISBN 9780830853953
- The Chinese in Mexico, 1882-1940. Tucson: The University of Arizona Press, 2010. ISBN 9780816514601
