= Chinese Hand Laundry Alliance =

American labor organization

The Chinese Hand Laundry Alliance (CHLA) was a labor organization formed in 1933 to protect the civil rights of overseas Chinese living in North America and "to help Chinese laundry workers break their isolation in American society." An openly left-wing organization, the CHLA used various means — including the slogans "To Save China, To Save Ourselves" and "Resist Japan and Save China” — to oppose the Japanese invasion of Manchuria.

== Background ==
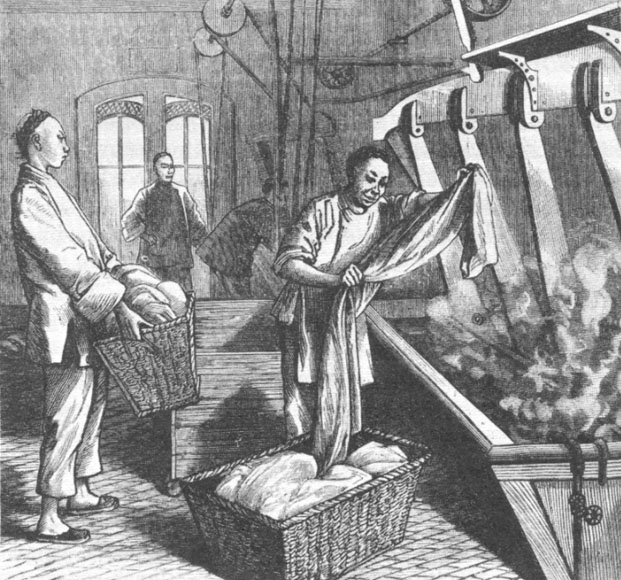
This 1881 image of a Chinese laundry in San Francisco shows "the stereotypical occupation of a whole ethnic group which led to the 1933 formation of Chinese Hand Laundry Alliance in New York City.

In the United States and Canada in the late 19th and early 20th centuries, the occupation of laundry worker was heavily identified with Chinese Americans to the extent that it became "the stereotypical occupation of a whole ethnic group." Racial discrimination, lack of English language skills, and a deficit of economic capital kept most Chinese Americans out of more desirable careers. Around the turn of the 20th century, one in four ethnic Chinese men in the United States worked in a laundry. Conditions were hard, and a typical launderer worked for ten to sixteen hours a day.

According to one description:

Laundry work was especially wearisome, because it meant the soaking, scrubbing, and ironing of clothing solely by hand; moreover, prompt and high quality service was necessary to keep customers satisfied. Workers in laundries and groceries received the going wage of twenty-five dollars per month, and despite long hours the work-week was seven days. For the majority of the Chinese, then, the daily routine was almost solely working, eating, and sleeping. There were few other occupations available to Chinese.

== New York City and the formation of the CHLA ==
At the beginning of the Great Depression, New York City had approximately 3,550 Chinese laundries. According to a first hand account:

Chinese laundrymen relied on their hands. On the door of every Chinese laundry were these two big words in red paint, "Hand Laundry," meaning all ironing was done by hand. In New York, perhaps seven out of ten Chinese survived by working in Chinese Hand Laundries. At the end of almost every residential block or alley, there was always a Chinese laundry. A Chinese laundry was usually small — about the size of five dining tables, equipped only with an ironing board and a shelf to put cleaned, ironed clothes that were packaged and ready to go.

With the support of white Americans in that same industry, in 1933 the New York City Board of Aldermen passed a law intended to drive the Chinese out of the business. Because Chinese-owned laundries charged less than other laundries, the law required all city-based laundries to be operated by United States citizens and post a $1,000 security bond. When their efforts were unsuccessfully opposed by the Chinese Consolidated Benevolent Association, a "conservative Chinese social organization", the openly leftist Chinese Hand Laundry Alliance was formed. Where the Chinese Consolidated Benevolent Association failed, the Chinese Hand Laundry Alliance hired attorney Julius Bezozo, the son of Polish Jewish immigrants. Bezozo successfully lobbied the council to exempt "Orientals" from the requirement to be United States citizens and to decrease the amount of the bond to $100, which preserved the livelihood of thousands of Chinese laundry workers. In the wake of that success, the Chinese Hand Laundry Alliance continued to advocate for the civil rights of Chinese people in North America. For both members and non-members, the cost to engage the aid of the organization was twenty five cents.

== Opposition to invasion of Manchuria ==
The Chinese Hand Laundry Alliance also strongly opposed the 1931 Japanese invasion of Manchuria. Like many overseas Chinese, organization members denounced the nonresistance of China's ruling Kuomintang Party (KMT) led by Chiang Kai-shek and actively engaged in "Save China" campaigns to raise money for the resistant efforts of the Manchurian Chinese. The CHLA sent letters and telegrams to American politicians urging them to support Chinese resistance and to take an anti-Japanese stance.

CHLA members also appealed directly to the customers of their New York area laundries and published articles such as one (originally published in Chinese) in a 1937 edition of the Chinese Vanguard which describes their efforts in some detail:

The New York Chinese Hand Laundry Alliance has been extremely dedicated to the work of resisting Japan to save our country. Immediately following the Marco Polo Bridge incident, the HLA began to organize a campaign to raise funds for China. Aside from the sum of around 4,300 Silver Dollars that the HLA collected during its first and second period of fund-raising and which was already sent to China, the Alliance has raised an additional 1,230 Silver Dollars and twenty-seven cents during its third fund-raising period. This sum was given to the two gentlemen Chen Yeh and Chen Chia, who wired it directly from the Bank of China to the Treasury Department of the Chinese Central Government, so that the money could be used to supplement the government’s military funds....because the Alliance realizes that most Americans sympathize with our country, it has initiated a number of activities aimed at Americans, such as that of soliciting donations for medical supplies from American customers of hand laundries. It also contributed significantly by distributing English-language publicity material that called for the boycott of Japanese goods. With winter approaching, refugees and wounded soldiers in China will be in desperate need of relief, and even western customers of hand laundries have frequently suggested that the Alliance broaden its campaign to collect funds for medical supplies. In response to this situation, the Alliance decided last month to broaden its fund-raising activities. It has recently made ready the first 5,000 donation boxes, which will be distributed to hand laundries for the purpose of collecting funds from laundry customers. In addition, on October 31, at 4 PM, the Alliance will be sponsoring an anti-Japan publicity conference at its headquarters, to which Professor Chi Chao....China’s representative to the Pacific Scholars' Conference—has been invited as a speaker. The Mayor of New York has been eagerly assisting the work of the Alliance, and will be sending as his representative to the conference the President of the City Council, Mr. Esser. Undoubtedly, Mr. Esser will be offering an eloquent speech to celebrate the patriotism of Chinese living in America. It is said that the Alliance will especially welcome the participation in the conference of Chinese active in all sectors of Chinese-American society.

An article in the same publication the following year stated in part:

Not only was the HLA the first organization in New York to advocate raising funds to assist Chinese military resistance against Japan after the occurrence of the Marco Polo Bridge incident, the Alliance also initiated the movement to collect donations from westerners by placing relief boxes in hand laundries. At the same times, the Alliance distributed English-language leaflets calling on westerners to aid China. The HLA used the money it collected to buy ambulances. Bringing together Chinese and western associations, the Alliance organized—in support of the “Resist Japan and Save China” campaign—a demonstration which paraded at its head the ambulances purchased by the Alliance, and which was followed by a mass rally. What is the significance of these mass gatherings? First, most Americans sympathize with our country and are willing to help us, but many do not know how. The sight of the ambulances reminded Americans of the bestial acts committed by Japanese thieves who cruelly murdered our women and children, and these Americans reacted in anger against such acts. The ambulances also reminded them of how desperately our refugees and brave soldiers needed material assistance, a reminder that caused them to think about how they could emulate the actions of the HLA. When they saw the orderly manner in which the demonstration and rally proceeded, and the excitement of all the participants, they understood that the unyielding spirit and organizational capacity of the Chinese people guaranteed that the final victory will belong to China. When the ambulances were displayed before the headquarters of the HLA, many western spectators were moved to tears. Some said, “I put money into the donation box of the HLA, I have to see the ambulances.” From this reaction one can see the HLA’s campaign allowed westerners to feel themselves included in the movement to save China, and encouraged them to assist us with still greater enthusiasm.

== China Daily News and the Red Scare ==
In 1940, China Hand Laundry Alliance members began publishing their own newspaper, the China Daily News (a different publication from the China Daily News, a modern Traditional Chinese-language newspaper published in Tainan City, Taiwan). The "only Chinese-language newspaper in the U.S. that was not pro-Nationalist", it attracted negative attention from the United States Government and:

In 1952 it was tried for violating the Trading with the Enemy Act, because employees continued to send remittances to China. Its editor and three officers of the paper were sent to prison for running an advertisement, posted by a mainland-Chinese bank, urging Overseas Chinese to repatriate money to relatives.

So great was the belief that the publication promoted Communism, even the paper's 6500 subscribers were investigated by the government. The CHLA continued its political and social struggles "against institutionalized racism and class oppression, tied to the fight for China’s self-determination", but during the era of McCarthyism, "the loyalties of over ten thousand American citizens of Chinese descent were questioned based on their ethnicity and alleged risk to national security." Eventually, targeted by the Federal Bureau of Investigation during the Second Red Scare and faced with surveillance and interrogations, membership in the China Hand Laundry Alliance sharply declined. In the 1980 documentary The Chinatown Files:

Henry Chin, a laundry worker and president of the Chinese Hand Laundry Alliance and the China Daily News, describes how Chinese immigrants came to America for a better life for themselves and the loved ones they left behind in their impoverished villages. Yet for sending money home, his friends were charged by the U.S. government for trading with the enemy and his life was shattered by constant FBI surveillance and harassment.

== Later history ==
The 1993 musical The Last Hand Laundry In Chinatown was in part "an homage to the struggles of the pioneering NYC Chinese Hand Laundry Alliance." Chinese laundries have effectively "vanished into history, made obsolete by social and technological changes".
