= The Chinese in Mexico =

- Author: Robert Chao Romero
- Language: English
- Genre: History
- Publisher: University of Arizona Press
- Publication date: 2010
- Pages: 272
- ISBN: 978-0816-5146-01
- OCLC: 550553836

The Chinese in Mexico, 1882–1940 is a 2010 book by Robert Chao Romero, published by the University of Arizona Press, about the history of Chinese immigration to Mexico. This is the first English-language monograph written about Chinese immigration to Mexico. Anju Reejhsinghani of University of Wisconsin-Stevens Point described it as "a social history of the small but influential Chinese merchant and laboring community in northern Mexico in the first half of the twentieth century." Erika Lee of the University of Minnesota stated that because much of the existing literature on Asian immigration to North and South America discusses the United States, this book "fills an enormous historiographical gap."

The topics include anti-Chinese discrimination and Chinese settlement patterns. The book has printed examples of anti-Chinese propaganda, including song lyrics and political cartoons, produced in Mexico. Lee stated that Romero's method of cataloging the relationships in the community, which include economic and social relations, is the "diasporic transnational" method which illustrates the simultaneous Chinese-Mexican ties to other Chinese communities in the Americas and their home villages in southern China. Of three books about the Chinese-Mexican community, with the others being Chinese Mexicans: Transpacific Migration and the Search for a Homeland, 1910–1960 and Making the Chinese Mexican: Global Migration, Localism, and Exclusion in the U.S.-Mexico Borderlands, Reejhsinghani described The Chinese in Mexico as the "most accessible".

== Background ==
Robert Chao Romero is a professor at the University of California, Los Angeles in the César E. Chávez Department of Chicana and Chicano Studies. The book originated as a PhD dissertation.

The author used archival records from Mexico and the United States. These archival records included municipal census manuscripts from Mexico produced in the 1930s, reports from U.S. consulates, and Immigration and Naturalization Service (INS) Chinese Exclusion Act case files. The census manuscripts include demographic information about the community. The U.S. files have information about Chinese who entered Southern California and then traveled onwards to Mexico, their final destination.

== Contents ==
The first two chapters, including the first main chapter, discuss Chinese immigration patterns, covering those the world and giving context to the immigration to Mexico. The topics include chain migration of families, international recruitment of contract labor, and smuggling of immigrants. The first main chapter discusses reasons why many Chinese immigrated from Guangdong.

The next two chapters discuss the transnational nature of Chinese-Mexican life. Within Chapter 4, there is content about interracial marriages between Mexicans and Chinese, specifically between Chinese males and Mexican females. This chapter also discusses overall patterns of marriages and families and gender aspects of the Chinese in Mexico. The chapter discusses the Mexican attitudes against these marriages; some Mexican males believed the fact that Chinese men were marrying Mexican women threatened their sense of manhood.

Chapter 5 discusses the types of jobs held by Chinese-Mexicans, Chinese-Mexican community organizations, and disputes about the opium business; the Tong Wars, discussed in the chapter, occurred in the 1920s. Chapter 6 discusses the reception of the Mexican people to Chinese immigration; the information on anti-Chinese sentiment is included in this chapter. In the final chapter the author proposes establishing a dedicated field of study of Chinese-Latin Americans.

== Reception ==
May-Lee Chai of San Francisco State University wrote that the book is "a fascinating study" that "provides a much-needed corrective."

Erika Lee of the University of Minnesota wrote that the book "is a powerful and important example of just how promising the development of [the field of Chinese-Latin American studies] could be."

Reejhsinghani stated that the three books about the Chinese Mexicans, including The Chinese in Mexico, "are well written, amply documented, and groundbreaking in scope" but that "their transnational focus might make challenging reading for those lacking training in Asian, Asian American, Latin American, or world history."
