= The Matthew 25 Network =

The Matthew 25 Network is a Political Action Committee (PAC) geared towards supporting progressive candidates for American public office who possess what the organization considers to be a strong Christian faith. Matthew 25 Network was founded in 2008 by Mara Vanderslice.

== Name ==
The group’s name, Matthew 25 references the 25th chapter of the gospel of Matthew in which during the Parable of the Sheep and the Goats, Jesus Christ summarizes His judgment of the righteous as follows: “For I was hungry and you gave me something to eat, I was thirsty and you gave me something to drink, I was a stranger and you invited me in, I needed clothes and you clothed me, I was sick and you looked after me, I was in prison and you came to visit me.”

== Founding ==
Matthew 25 Network was founded by Mara Vanderslice, who in 2004 was director of religious outreach for the Kerry-Edwards campaign. She also did religious outreach for several Democratic candidates on the state level including: Governor of Ohio Ted Strickland, Governor of Kansas Kathleen Sebelius and Senator Bob Casey of Pennsylvania.

== 2008 presidential election ==
The Matthew 25 Network endorsed Barack Obama in his bid for the White House. Their efforts focused primarily on reaching out to targeted religious communities which the Network felt would be key to his success on election day including “Catholics, moderate evangelicals, Hispanic Catholics and Protestants” as printed on official literature of the Matthew 25 Network.

The Matthew 25 Network is based primarily around grassroots efforts by mobilizing voters of the Christian left. On July 1, 2008 The Network began airing its first radio ad, to announce its support for President-elect Barack Obama on Christian radio. On August 15, 2008 the Matthew 25 network began airing its first television ad. Along with airing ads of their own, the Matthew 25 Network worked to repudiate false attacks which they felt were offensive, misguided and untrue. On July 31, the Network launched its site PutAwayFalsehood.com to counter what they believed to be false emails, rumors and accusations concerning President Barack Obama.
