= Anti-Sikh sentiment in Canada =

Chronology since 1897

Within Canada, anti-Sikh sentiment has included hostility, prejudice, or discrimination against Canadian Sikhs as a religious and ethnic group. This form of racism has affected Sikhs in the country since Canada's Sikh community was established in 1897. In recent times, anti-Sikh hate speech has increased steeply in Canada.

In 2026, an extensive survey by the World Sikh Organization reported that 91% of Sikhs have been targeted for being “visibly identifiable" and 80% of Sikh respondents have reported a rise in discrimination in the past five years.

== Background ==
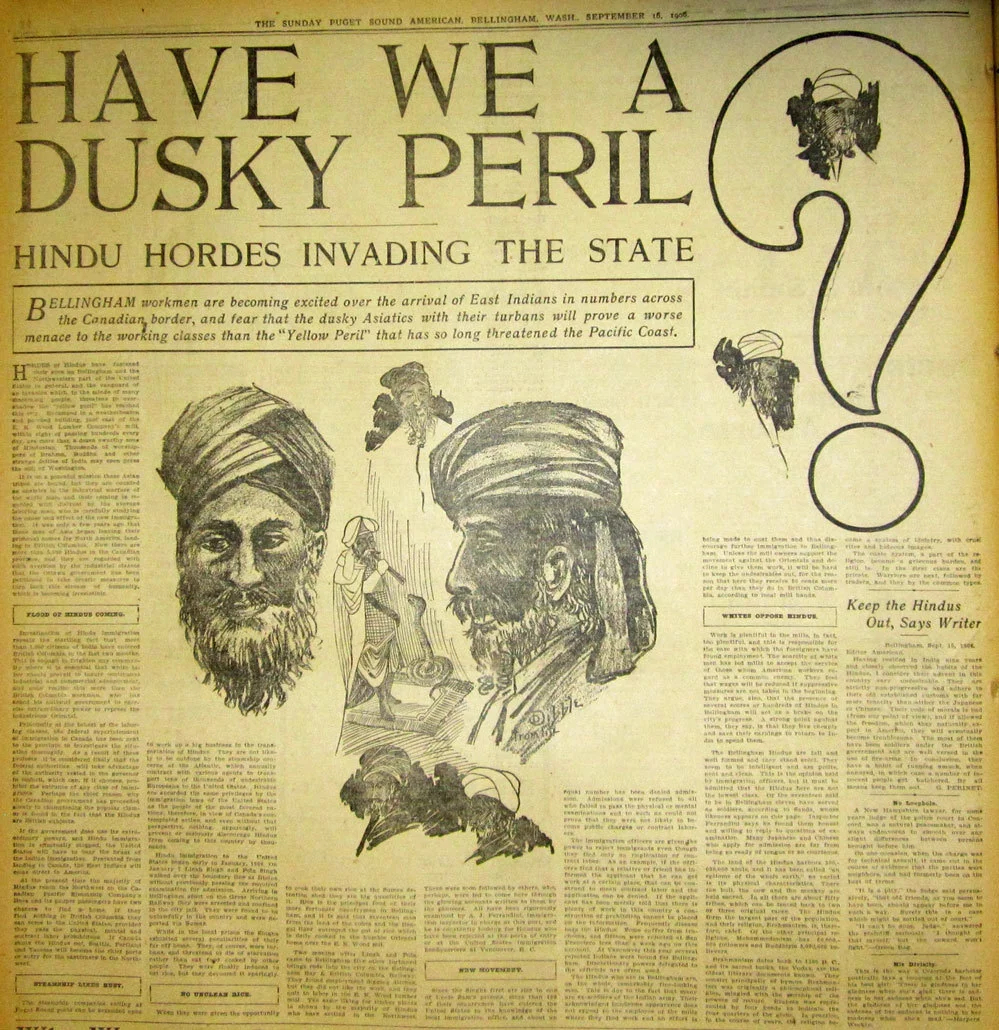
Article from the 16 September 1906 Puget Sound American newspaper incorrectly describing turbaned Sikhs as "Hindu" and their unfavourable immigration to Bellingham, Washington

Anti-Sikh sentiment in Canada has a historical and contemporary presence marked by several key events and ongoing issues. Early instances include the 1907 Bellingham Race Riot, where South East Asian and South Asian immigrants, mostly Sikhs, were violently targeted by white mobs in Washington, U.S., spilling over into Canadian anti-immigrant sentiments and the Pacific Northwest.

The 1914 Komagata Maru incident further highlighted this sentiment when 376 Indian passengers, mostly Sikhs, were denied entry into Canada and forced to return to India, where many faced persecution.

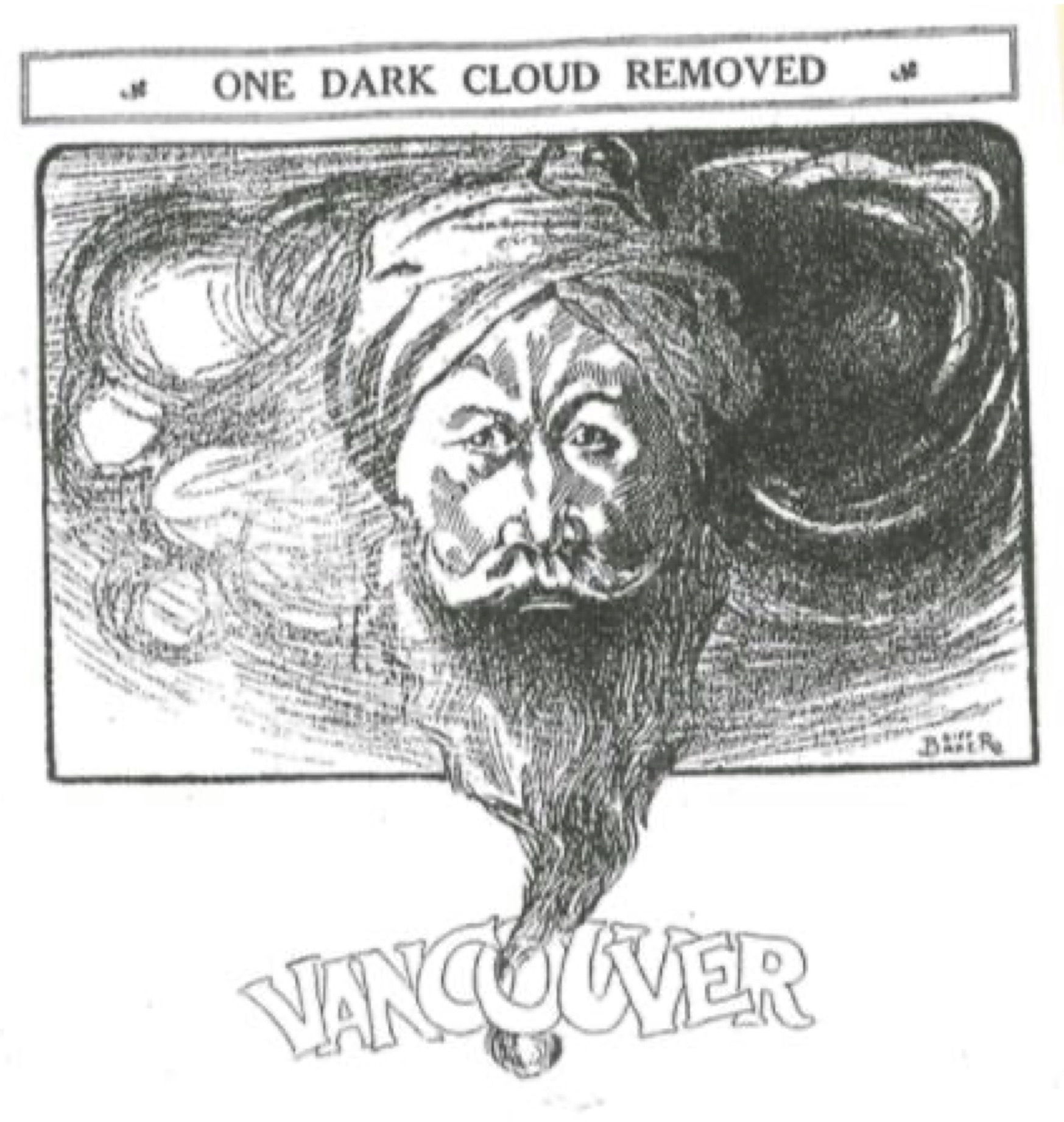
Cartoon titled 'One Dark Cloud Removed', a caricaturization of the racial tensions between White-Canadians and Sikh immigrants, Vancouver, British Columbia, Canada, 1914

During the late 20th and early 21st century, Canadian Sikhs have experienced increased racism and hate crimes particularly with those who have a turban and beard. This includes key events such as the 1990 Herman Bittner calendar controversy, the 1999 murder of a Sikh caretaker by Neo-Nazis, aftermath of the September 11 attacks, the ongoing vandalisms of Sikh Gurdwaras and the controversial Quebec Bill 21.

Most recently due to high levels of immigration from India to Canada, it has led to increased negative sentiment targeted at Sikhs as well as other religious communities. Former MP and New Democratic Party leader, Jagmeet Singh has been subject to a high level racial attacks.

== Early 20th century ==
=== 1907: Disenfranchisement of Asian immigrants ===
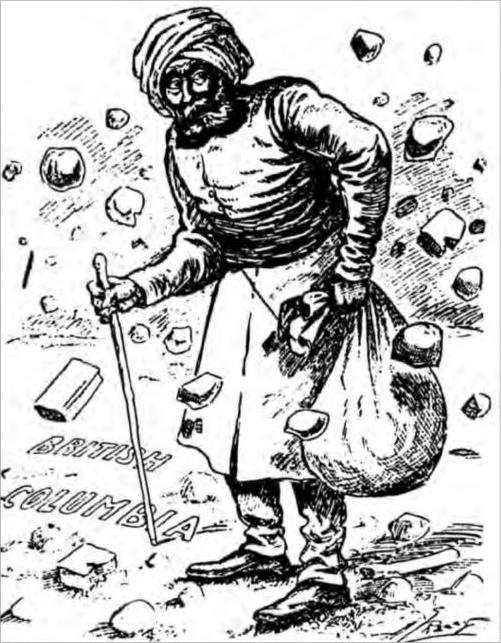
Cartoon of an elderly Sikh man having rocks thrown at him in British Columbia, Canada, The Montreal Daily Star, March 1908. Captioned: "Hindoo British Subject. Alas! I must be mistaken! I thought the word 'British' meant Freedom and Liberty!" South Asians lost the right-to-vote in 1907 in British Columbia.

In 1907, British Columbia enacted legislation that disenfranchised Asian immigrants, including Sikhs, reflecting the widespread anti-Asian sentiment of the period. These laws were part of a broader strategy to limit the political, economic, and social integration of Asian communities within Canadian society. This was called the Asiatic Exclusion League (AEL) the aimed to prevent immigration of people of Asian origin.

After the Bellingham race riot on September 5, 1907, many Sikh mill workers took refuge in Vancouver, British Columbia. As South Asian and Sikh refugees arrived in Vancouver, AEL organizers pressed forward with a plan to march through the streets, waving signs and flags that called for “A White Canada.”

In 1911, Sunder Singh, a surgeon addressed the Canadian Club in Toronto, Ontario alleging that Canada's discrimination against the Sikhs was an injustice to them and to the British Empire. Singh argued the case that Sikh men were not allowed to bring their wives and children to Canada, only were able to travel through one direct steamer and were required to have four times the money than of the Japanese immigrants. In a 1911 newspaper release The Toronto World reported "They (Sikhs) are required to have $200 each as against $50 from the Mongolians. Ruthenians, Galicians, Doukhobors, Polacks and other foreign peoples are admitted without restriction."

Indian Civil Service officer Andrew Fraser criticized the treatment of Sikhs in Canada as "scandalous" and suggested that recognizing their rights and providing fair and equal treatment as British subjects could help reduce unrest in India. Senator James Douglas addressing a similar issue, also condemned British Columbia's treatment of Sikhs, stating that it was "unchristian, un-British, and ungrateful," particularly given the Sikh contributions to the British Empire.

=== 1914: Komagata Maru Incident ===
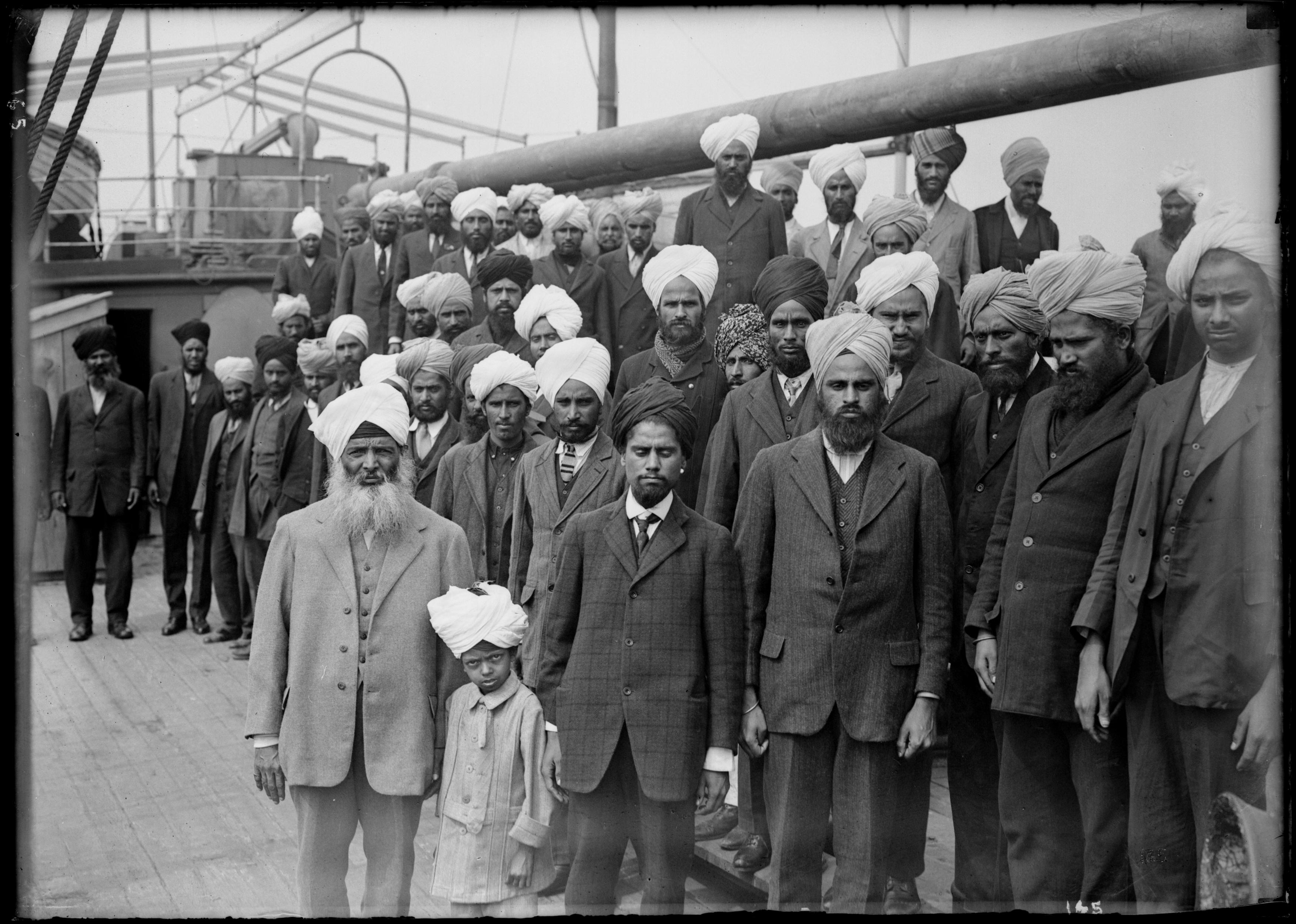
Turbaned Sikhs aboard Komagata Maru (1914)

The Komagata Maru incident of 1914 is a poignant example of racial discrimination and xenophobia in early 20th-century Canada. The Japanese steamship SS Komagata Maru, which departed from Hong Kong and arrived in Vancouver on May 23, 1914, was carrying 376 passengers, predominantly Sikh immigrants from the Punjab region of British India. Despite their lawful status as British subjects, the passengers were barred from disembarking due to Canada's restrictive immigration policies aimed at preventing non-European immigrants from entering the country.

The Canadian government's refusal to allow the ship's passengers to land was a manifestation of the broader racial prejudices of the time. After two months of being held in harsh conditions aboard the ship, the Komagata Maru was forced to return to India. Upon arrival in Calcutta, the passengers resisted an attempt by the police to arrest them, resulting in a riot that killed twenty of the passengers.

In 2008, Prime Minister Stephen Harper apologised for the incident, but many in the local Sikh community refused to accept it and requested it should have been made at the House of Commons. This then took place in 2016, Prime Minister Justin Trudeau and the Liberal government formally apologized for the incident, acknowledging the injustices faced by the passengers and marked an official recognition of this chapter in Canadian history.

=== Labour market restrictions ===
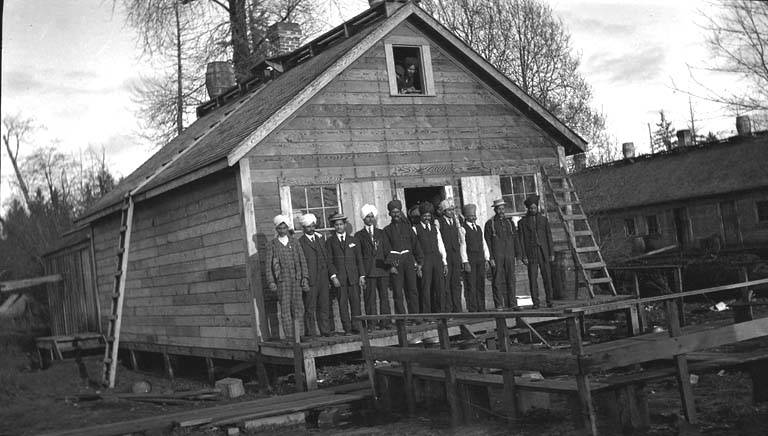
Sikh men standing in front of a house at a lumber camp in British Columbia (Circa 1914)

Throughout the early 20th century, Sikhs, along with other Asian immigrants, faced significant obstacles in the labour market. They were often confined to low-paying, menial jobs and encountered hostility and discrimination from white labour unions. Exclusionary policies and societal prejudices restricted their employment opportunities, limiting them to sectors like agriculture, lumber mills, and railway construction, where they endured harsh working conditions and exploitation. This systemic discrimination not only hindered their economic prospects but also reinforced broader societal biases, perpetuating a cycle of marginalization and inequality for Asian communities in North America.

=== Propaganda and public sentiment ===
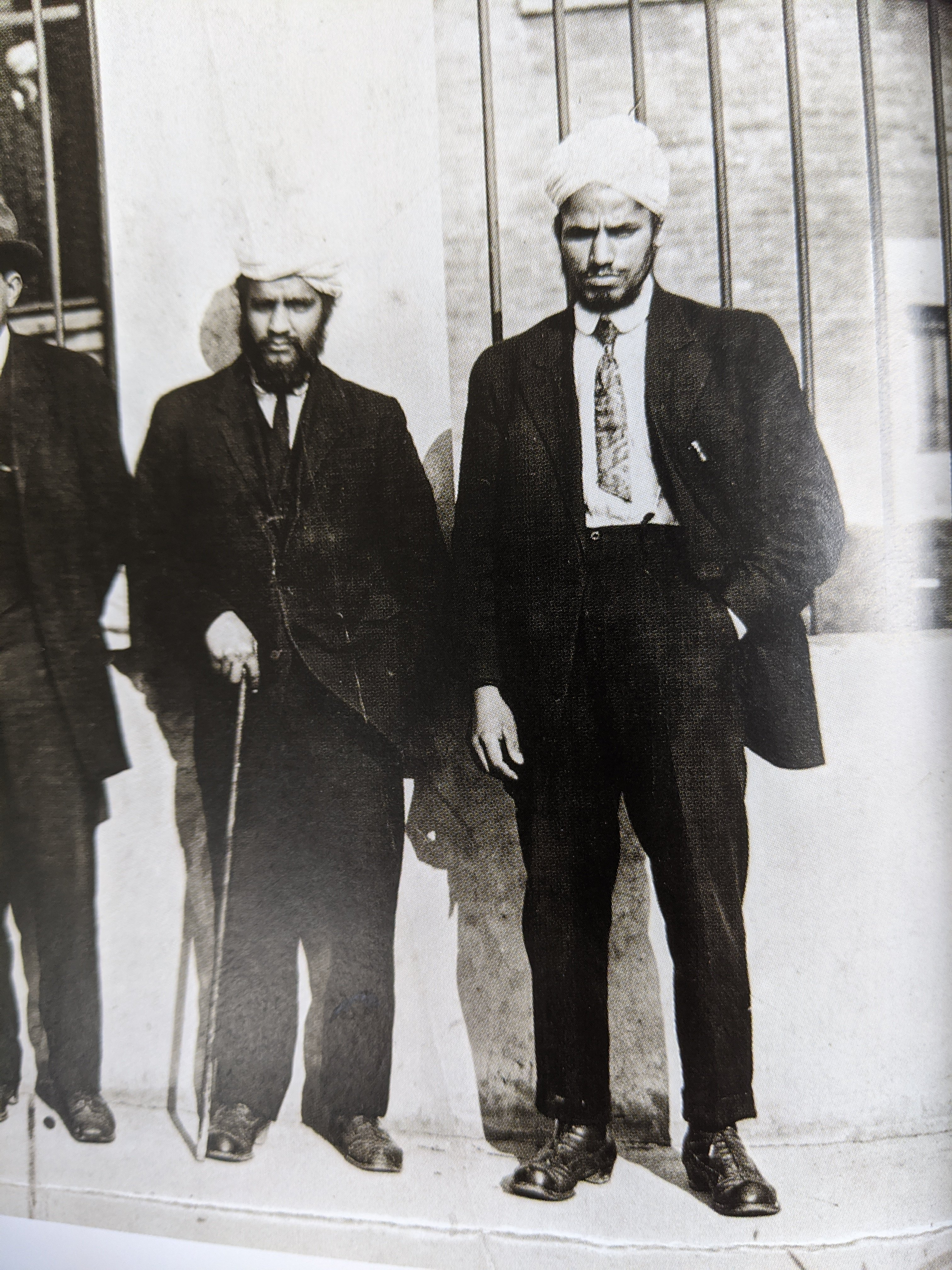
Photograph of Sikh activists standing in-front of a detention centre, supporting the Sikhs in-jail who were imprisoned due to racist immigration laws, Victoria, Canada, 1913

During the early 20th century, some newspapers and political figures portrayed Sikhs and other Asian immigrants as challenges to Canadian society, economy and the demography. These portrayals may have contributed to the public opposition towards Sikhs and other South Asians. However, some politicians, such as Senator James Douglas, expressed favourable views toward Sikh migrants in Canada.

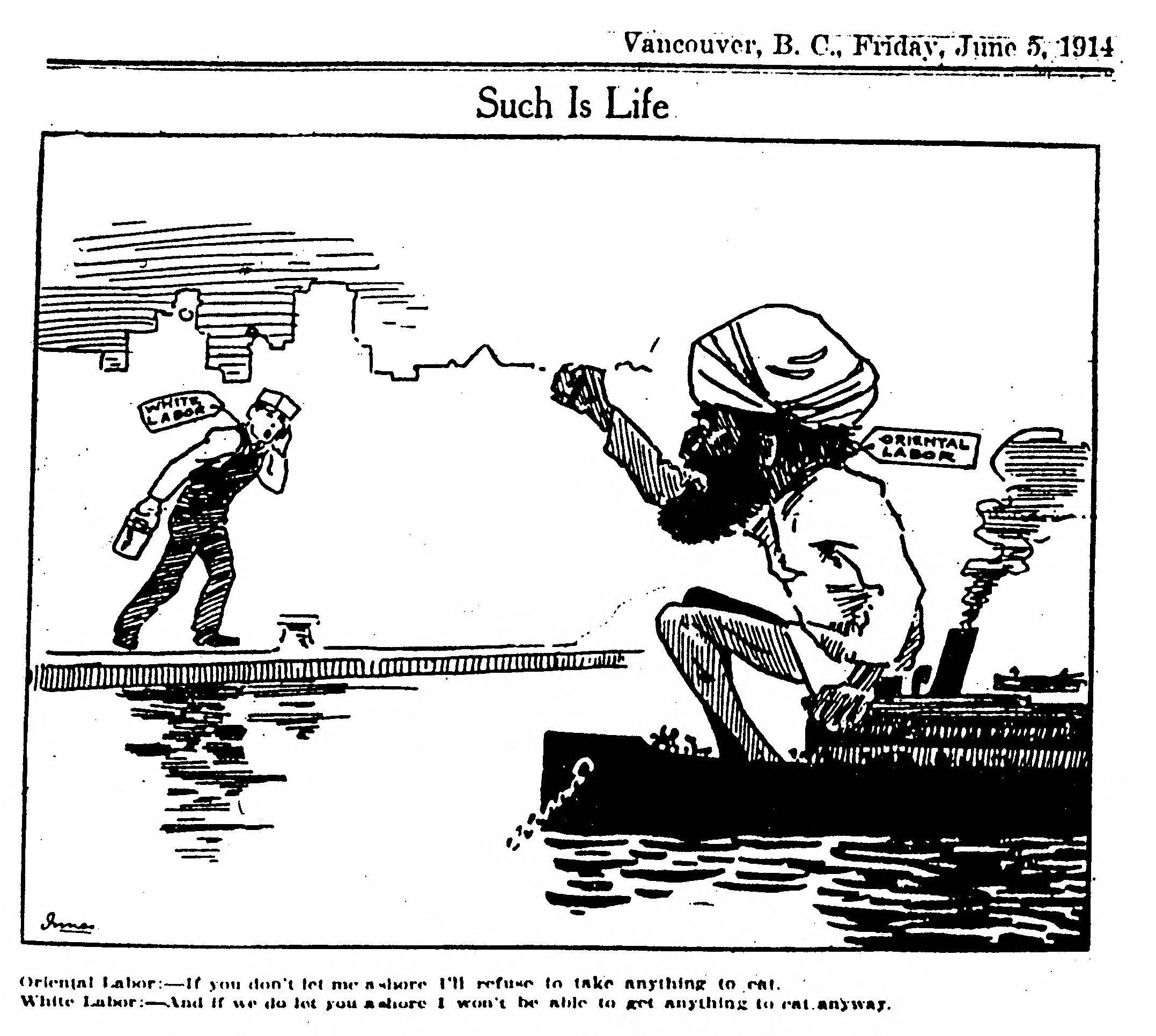
Cartoon titled 'Such Is Life' depicting a Sikh man representing "oriental labor", a caricaturization of the racial tensions between White-Canadians labourers and South Asian immigrants, Vancouver newspaper, Friday, 5 June 1914

Between 1910 and 1920, a fall in almost half the number of the 2,000 Indians in Canada, many of whom were Sikhs, was a result of the racism they faced, intention to reunify with family members who migrated to America and for economic opportunities.

== Mid 20th century ==
During the mid-20th century, Sikhs in Canada faced pervasive racism and discrimination, reflecting the broader challenges of immigrant communities in a society that was often unwelcoming to visible minorities. Common insults such as 'raghead' have been used for turbaned wearing Sikhs. Despite their contributions to the country, Sikhs were frequently marginalized, encountering significant barriers to employment, housing, and social acceptance.

In the late 1970s, some leaders of Toronto's Sikh community warned there would be racial riots unless there people get more police protection due to increasing number of incidents outside a Sikh Temple. However, Chairman of Toronto's Study Group on Human Relations and Former Member of Parliament, Walter Pitman said that "racist attacks were declining".

=== 1970-1980 ===
==== 1971 Khalsa Diwan Gurdwara Incident ====
In 1971, Khalsa Diwan Society Vancouver Gurdwara in Downtown Vancouver was defaced with obscenities. A fight erupted afterwards amongst the Sikh congregation and the perpetrators leading to injuries.

== Late 20th century ==
=== 1980–1990 ===
==== 1981 Vancouver Assault ====
Two Sikh men, Gordon Kooner and his friend who wears a turban, were in a gas station when Thomas Henry Burris made racial insults towards his friend. Kooner intervened which resulted in him being physically assaulted. Following the event, Burris was later sent to prison for two years.

==== 1985 Air India Flight 182 aftermath ====
After the aftermath of Air India Flight 182, hostility towards Sikhs in Canada increased significantly, driven by a surge in suspicion and prejudice against the community. In the aftermath of the tragedy, Sikhs across the country experienced heightened discrimination and racism. Many faced harassment in public spaces. The media's portrayal of Sikhs often unfairly linked the community with violence and extremism, which further deepened public mistrust. Despite the Sikh community's widespread condemnation of the attack, they faced a challenging period marked by fear, prejudice, and social marginalization in Canada.

=== 1990–2000 ===
==== 1999 Sikh caretaker murder ====
In 1999, five white supremacists in British Columbia were sentenced for the killing of 65-year-old Sikh caretaker Nirmal Singh Gill. Lee Nikkel, 18, and Robert Kluch, 26, received 15-year sentences plus 18 months already served, for initiating and carrying out the attack. Radoslaw Synderek, 24, Daniel Miloszewski, 22, and Nathan LeBlanc, 27, were each sentenced to 12 years. Judge William Stewart condemned the crime as repugnant and racially motivated, hoping the sentences would deter violent hate crimes. The Sikh community and friends of Gill viewed the sentencing as justice served.

== 21st century ==
=== 2000–2010 ===
==== 2005 Vancouver soccer incident ====
In 2005, at a junior soccer tournament in Vancouver, Gurindar Durah, a Sikh player, was barred from the soccer match for wearing his patka, a religious turban. This decision led to Durah's ejection and his team, Northwest United, walking out in protest. Durah's coach, Mario Moretti supported his decision, stating that the tournament ended for them once the referee made that ruling.

=== 2010–2020 ===
==== 2012 Neo-Nazi racial attack ====
On March 24, two Sikh men were attacked outside an Edmonton, Alberta liquor store after a rally by the members Bernard “Bernie” Miller and Kyle McKee of the white supremacist group Blood & Honour. One of the men was subjected to racial slurs inside the store and was then confronted and assaulted as he exited. During the attack, one assailant struck the victim in the head with a full bottle of alcohol and the broken glass was used to stab him.

==== 2015 Edmonton, Alberta gurdwara vandalism ====
In January 2015, Sri Guru Singh Sabha Gurdwara in South Edmonton was vandalized with racist graffiti, including the phrase "Leave Canada." The gurdwara's management is addressing the incident, emphasizing education and community outreach as ways to combat ignorance. Community members were urged to remain vigilant and to report suspicious activity around gurdwaras to the authorities.

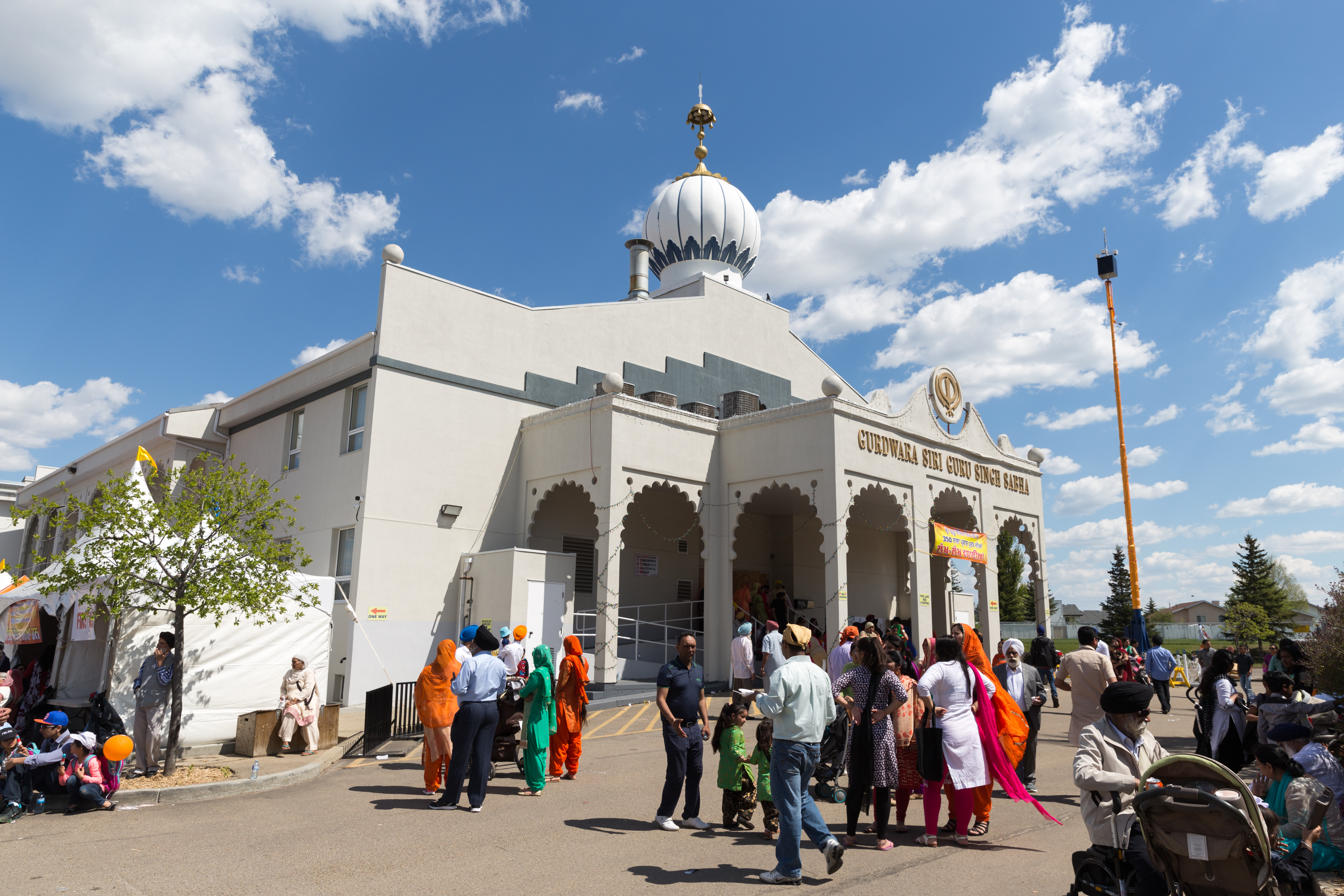
Sri Guru Singh Sabha Gurdwara in Edmonton, Alberta

==== 2015 Harjit Sajjan racially abused ====
In November 2015, Sikh MP Harjit Sajjan, who was newly appointed as Minister of National Defence, faced racist abuse on social media. The incident occurred on the Canadian Forces' Facebook page, particularly on the French-language version, where derogatory comments were made by a few military personnel, including a Warrant Officer from CFB Valcartier.

The Canadian Forces quickly deleted the comments and launched an investigation, reiterating that racism and discrimination have no place in the military. The incident gained significant media attention, both in Canada and India, highlighting the challenges of racism within the armed forces.

==== 2016 Quebec City assault ====
In April 2016, Supninder Singh Khehra, a Sikh man from Toronto, was attacked in Quebec City, Quebec by Gabriel Royer-Tremblay in a racially motivated assault. The attack, which was recorded on video, involved Khehra being punched, kicked, and having his turban knocked off. The incident sparked national outrage, including condemnation from Prime Minister Justin Trudeau. Royer-Tremblay was sentenced to ten months in jail for the assault and related offences.

==== 2016 Calgary, Alberta gurdwara vandalism ====
On December 23, 2016, a Sikh gurdwara in Calgary, Canada, was vandalized in an incident that shocked the local Sikh community. The outer walls and doors of the Gurdwara were defaced with racist graffiti, including a swastika, a smiling face, and profane messages, spray-painted by unknown perpetrators. This act of vandalism, which took place in the early hours of the morning, was widely condemned by community leaders and organizations.

==== 2017 Jagmeet Singh racially abused ====
During a public event in Brampton, Ontario, a heckler hurled racist comments at Canadian Sikh politician Jagmeet Singh, accusing him of supporting Sharia law and being a Muslim. Despite her outburst, the heckler later claimed she was not racist. The incident sparked widespread condemnation and highlighted ongoing issues of racism and ignorance.

On October 2, 2019, New Democratic Party leader Jagmeet Singh was confronted by a man in Montreal, Quebec who told him to “Cut your turban off.” Singh put one hand on the man's shoulder and responded: “I think Canadians look like all sorts of people. That's the beauty of Canada.”

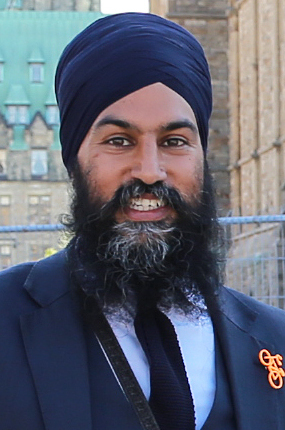
NDP Leader, MP Jagmeet Singh has been subject to several incidents of racial abuse directed towards his Sikh faith.

During the 2019 Canadian federal election, Jagmeet Singh faced questions about wearing of a turban and whether that would reduce the number of people who would vote for him. Jonathan Richardson, the former federal NDP's executive member for Atlantic Canada, who defected to the Green Party, stated in an interview with CBC Radio, that some potential NDP candidates were hesitant to run in New Brunswick, due to Singh's turban. CTV News covered a Singh event in Verner, Ontario and spoke to a number of voters there, including NDP supporters, who said that they would not vote for a leader wearing a turban. The NDP won 24 seats, down from 44 seats at the 2015 election. It was the lowest seat count for the NDP since 2004. The NDP lost all but one of its seats in Quebec, where it was suggested that Singh's Sikhism may have been negatively received by Quebec voters in the context of the Quebec ban on religious symbols.

==== 2018 Kelowna, British Columbia gurdwara vandalism ====
On November 21, 2018, members of the Gurdwara Guru Amardas Darbar Sikh Society in Kelowna, British Columbia discovered racist graffiti scrawled on the wall of their Gurdwara.

Amanpreet Singh Hundal, B.C. vice-president of the World Sikh Organization, expressed surprise and disappointment that such an event could occur in 2018. Despite the shock, community leaders viewed the incident as an opportunity to promote education and strengthen connections with the broader Kelowna community. The racist vandalism was widely condemned, serving as a stark reminder of the ongoing challenges of ignorance and fear that minority communities continue to face.

==== 2018 incident at Tignish, Prince Edward Island Legion ====
In January 2018, a Sikh man named Jaswinder Singh Dhaliwal was asked to remove his turban, while visiting a Royal Canadian Legion branch in Tignish, Prince Edward Island. The incident, which included racist remarks and threats from other patrons, was a result of a misunderstanding of the legion's headgear policy, which exempts religious garments. Legion president, Stephen Gallant later issued an apology.

=== 2020–present ===
==== 2021 Edmonton Gurdwara Harassment ====
In July 2021, Edmonton's Singh Sabha Gurdwara faced months of targeted harassment, including racist phone calls and the delivery of meat to the Gurdwara's doorstep intended to insult the Sikh community. This led local political leaders and Sikh representatives to call for stronger action against hate crimes. The incident was investigated further by the Edmonton Police Service and anti-racism advocacy groups.

==== 2021 Brampton, Ontario school vandalism ====
In December 2021, in Brampton, Ontario, the Brampton Khalsa Montessori School was targeted with hateful graffiti against Sikhs, defacing the front of a ground-floor business beneath the school with offensive messages.

==== 2022 Ron Banerjee comments ====
On June 29, 2022, in a video on the YouTube channel 'Beat of the North,' Ron Banerjee, director of the Canadian Hindu Advocacy, was recorded expressing hateful remarks, stating he supports the killings of Muslims and Sikhs in India because "they deserve to die," while discussing unfavourable opinions about Canadian Prime Minister Justin Trudeau.

==== 2023 Kelowna, British Columbia assault ====
On March 20, 2023, a Sikh international student was swarmed and beaten by a group of people who ripped off his turban and dragged him across the sidewalk by his hair in Kelowna, British Columbia.

==== 2024 Peterborough, Ontario Assault ====
As reported by The Peterborough Examiner in July 2024, Peterborough Police are classifying an incident as a hate crime after a Sikh man was allegedly assaulted and has his turban knocked off by four youths. Another man who intervened was also assaulted by the youngsters. In the scuffle, police said "another person knocked the turban from the man's head and stepped on it." The man who was wearing the turban was treated by paramedics at the scene.

==== 2024 St John's, Newfoundland Assault ====
On August 11, 2024, Taranpreet Singh, a 21-year-old student, was subjected to a racist attack at Sunshine Rotary Park in St. John's, Newfoundland and Labrador. While walking with his cousin and a friend, a man passed by and gave death threats to drown them. When Singh and his group asked why he made such a threat, the man launched into a racist tirade, calling them "dirbag raghead" — a derogatory term often used against Sikh men who wear turbans. He also accused them of "taking over" his country and claimed they were taking money from the government.

==== 2026 Woodstock, Ontario Assault ====
On December 24, 2025, an elderly Sikh man in Woodstock, Ontario was subjected to a racist attack in which he was verbally abused with Xenophobia remarks, threatened and physically assaulted. The incident, which was captured on video, showed the victim being told to “get out of my country,” prompting widespread outrage after it circulated online. Ontario Provincial Police later charged a youth in connection with the assault and confirmed that the attack was hate motivated, raising renewed concerns about increasing incidents of racism and violence against Sikhs in Canada.

==== 2026 Toronto, Ontario Assault ====
In July 2026, a Sikh man in Toronto, Ontario, was subjected to a hate motivated attack while in the area of Adelaide Street West and Spadina Avenue. According to Toronto Police Service, the victim, who was wearing religious attire, was targeted in an unprovoked assault in which the attacker struck him with a metal pole while making “anti-Sikh discriminatory comments.” He sustained minor head injuries. Toronto resident Mathieu Basuk, 44, was subsequently arrested and charged with assault with a weapon.

==== 2026 Edmonton Gurdwara attack ====
On the morning of 21 August 2026, the Nanaksar Gurdwara temple in Edmonton, Canada was attacked by a screwdriver-wielding assailant, leading to a 75-year-old man and a 51-year-old man suffering non-life-threatening injuries suffering injuries. The attacker is a white man. Prime Minister Mark Carney said "The attack at the Nanaksar Gurdwara in Edmonton this morning is appalling. My thoughts are with the two people who were injured and the wider community that is shaken by this terrible event".

== Distribution of anti-Sikh materials ==
In the 1980s, B'nai Brith Canada launched a complaint with the Canadian Human Rights Commission in an attempt to remove lapel pins, which were perceived as racist. The pins included a turbaned Sikh, an Oriental in a Chinese Coolie hat and semi-clothed black man holding a spear all staring at a white male with the inscription below "Who is the minority in Canada?".

In the 1990s, both authorities in Winnipeg and Calgary considered criminal charges against Herman Bittner who created and distributed an anti-Sikh calendar that portrayed a turbaned Royal Canadian Mounted Police officer alongside the derogatory question, "Is this Canadian, or does this make you Sikh?" The calendar, produced by Herman Bittner of Langdon, stirred significant controversy and concerns about inciting hatred. The calendar's distribution and the offensive portrayal prompted meetings between justice officials and Sikh representatives, who emphasized the need for legal action to address and curb such actions.

In April 2014, Brampton residents expressed anger over a flyer distributed by Immigration Watch Canada targeting the Sikh community. The flyer, named “The Changing Face of Brampton,” featured contrasting images of white people and Sikhs, alongside a message suggesting that declining percentages of "mainstream Canadians" in Brampton was due to immigration.

A similar incident occurred in September 2016, where the University of Alberta removed racist posters from its campus. The posters, which featured an image of a Sikh man in a yellow turban alongside a derogatory message, were discovered in multiple locations, including the main library. The university promptly addressed the situation and took down all twelve posters that were found.

== Role of the media ==
In 2005, the Canadian Broadcast Standards Council (CBSC) censored Montreal's CKAC station for airing "abusive" remarks by psychiatrist Pierre Mailloux, who referred to Sikhs as a "the Sikhs are a gang, a gang of bozos". The CBSC, responding to complaints about the "insulting racism" of Mailloux's comments, ordered the station to issue a full apology. The panel noted that while Mailloux was entitled to his views on general immigration issues, his specific targeting of the Sikh community crossed the line and was unacceptable.

The Broadbent Institute who run the PressProgress have claimed in 2024 that the Canadian Far-Right have been responsible in the targeting of Sikh and other South Asians Canadians through incitement of xenophobia. PressProgress and the Canadian Anti-Hate Network have argued that the Canadian Far-Right have particularly blamed Indo-Canadian Sikh men.

=== Social Media ===
Social media platforms such as 6ixBuzz have contributed to the increase in hate and racism towards the Canadian Sikh community.

In 2021, Jagmeet Singh attended a virtual Sikh Heritage Month event hosted by the Peel District School Board, which was disrupted by individuals attempting to join with racist and discriminatory usernames targeting Sikh and other minorities. The school board blocked the individuals and launched an investigation.

In 2024, a woman in Chilliwack, British Columbia was criminally charged with hate crimes following an investigation into “racially offensive social media content” amid a series of incidents targeting the Sikh community and other Indo-Canadians on social media platform, X.

== Role of Politicians ==
In 2019, Jagmeet Singh, MP and NDP Leader, was targeted in a racist tweet by a People's Party of Canada (PPC) candidate Mark Friesen. The tweet depicted Singh's turban, as a bomb with a lit fuse, sparking widespread condemnation including from Canadian Anti-Hate Network.

In July 2021, an affidavit filed in court alleged that People's Party of Canada leader Maxime Bernier made a racist remark about NDP leader Jagmeet Singh, saying Singh would "never get elected with that rag on his head." Bernier denied the accusation, stating that this was the only eyewitness account of him supposedly making a racist comment and accused political strategist Warren Kinsella of orchestrating a defamation campaign against him. In November 2021, Ontario Court dismissed Bernier's defamation lawsuit for failing anti-SLAPP screening test.

In February 2025, Viresh Bansal, the Ontario Liberal candidate for Oshawa, is facing backlash over a resurfaced social media post in which he made derogatory remarks, including a homophobic slur directed at Prime Minister Justin Trudeau and a comment about "cleaning trash people" in response to a post by federal NDP Leader Jagmeet Singh regarding the killing of Hardeep Singh Nijjar.

In April 2025, Saskatchewan Party MLA Racquel Hilbert apologized for falsely describing federal NDP Leader Jagmeet Singh as a terrorist during a March 25 legislative debate. Hilbert later admitted the comment was inaccurate and inappropriate, withdrawing it amid public backlash and condemnation from the Saskatchewan NDP.

In August 2026, an Alberta Prosperity Project event faced criticism after Ian Parkinson used a racist slur associated with turban wearing Sikhs whilst discussing policing in a proposed independent Alberta. The remark, which can target Sikh Canadians, was applauded by some attendees. Following public backlash, Parkinson stepped down from participating in the group's events.

== Employment issues ==
In the late 1980s, Baltej Dhillon faced opposition when he applied to become an RCMP officer and requested to wear a turban as part of his uniform,. This was against the RCMP's dress code at the time. Despite public pressure, internal politics and even death threats aimed at Dhillon, the government changed the policy in 1990, allowing Dhillon and other Sikh officers to wear turbans.

In 2012, Gurmukh Singh a driver for Aaroport Limousine Services alleged they cut him off for refusing to trim or tie back his religiously prescribed facial hair. This was settled in 2013, with agreement that Sikh drivers were no longer prohibited from maintaining untied beards under employment from Aaroport.

In 2019, Bill 21 in Quebec prevented Sikh workers, particularly those wearing of religious articles such as turbans and kirpans in the workplace. This law has prompted legal challenges and debates regarding religious freedom and secularism in Quebec.

== Statistics ==
Between 2019 and 2023, police‑reported hate crimes against South Asians in Canada surged over 227%, with Sikhs due to their visible symbols like turbans and kirpans bearing the brunt of many high‑profile physical and online attacks

Concurrently, online hate speech on platforms like X exploded, anti‑South Asian slur usage increased by 1,350% and extremist far‑right posts frequently singled out Sikhs and Politician Jagmeet Singh, linking their visibility to xenophobic “great replacement” narratives.

In 2026, the World Sikh Organization released a report titled Understanding and Addressing Anti-Sikh Hate in Canada. The findings indicate that more than 80% of respondents observed an increase in discrimination over the previous five years. Verbal harassment emerged as the most frequently reported form of hate, experienced by 65% of participants. Additionally, 91% said they had been targeted because they are visibly identifiable as Sikhs. Supporting this, recent data from Statistics Canada shows that police-reported hate crimes rose between 2022 and 2024.

== Organisations combating Anti-Sikh Sentiment ==
=== Canada's anti-racism strategy ===
It was announced during Sikh Heritage Month in 2024 by MP Kamal Khera of the Department of Canadian Heritage, that the Canadian Government will be putting forwards their first ever Anti-Racism Strategy and Canada's first Action Plan on Hate.

=== World Sikh Organization ===
The World Sikh Organization (WSO) is a non-profit organisation and was founded in 1984 in Canada in response to the anti-Sikh violence in India, particularly the events surrounding Operation Blue Star and the 1984 anti-Sikh pogroms. Established by Sikh leaders, it was created to protect and promote the interests of Sikhs globally.

Over the years, the WSO has played a significant role in advocating for Sikh rights, religious freedoms, and combating anti-Sikh hate in Canada.

In the 1990s, WSO was involved in the case of Baltej Singh Dhillon in his fight to wear a turban as a member of the Royal Canadian Mounted Police.

In 2006, WSO acted as legal interveners in the case of Multani v Commission scolaire Marguerite‑Bourgeoys to allow Sikh students to wear Kirpans in public schools. The Supreme Court of Canada made a decision that was unanimous and held that there was no evidence that the kirpan posed a safety risk.

In 2019, during the ongoing debate over Bill 21 in Quebec, the WSO were involved in a legal case World Sikh Organization of Canada v. Attorney General of Québec. It had been concluded that Québec's Court of Appeal upheld the legislation. Many of the challenges and events following Bill 21 are still being legally addressed by the WSO.

In 2026, WSO released a report titled Understanding and Addressing Anti-Sikh Hate in Canada.

== Organisations associated with Anti-Sikh Sentiment ==
=== Asiatic Exclusion League ===
Established in Vancouver in 1907, the Asiatic Exclusion League campaigned to restrict Asian immigration and promoted the idea of a “White Canada.” Its activities contributed to an exclusionary political climate affecting South Asian immigrants, most of whom in British Columbia at the time were Sikhs.

=== Diagolon (Canada) ===
Diagolon, a Canadian far-right network associated with white nationalism has encouraged South Asians to leave Canada and had an instance in which a prominent member targeted an individual specifically for being Sikh.

=== Blood and Honour ===
Blood & Honour, a white supremacist organisation has been associated with violence against Sikhs in Canada. In 2012, two Sikh men in Edmonton were assaulted by individuals identified as members of Blood & Honour in what was described as a racially motivated attack.

=== Dominion Society of Canada ===
Founded by Daniel Tyrie, Dominion Society of Canada advocates “remigration” and significant restrictions on non-European immigration. The organization promotes deporting South Asian people and it places a specific focus on Canada's Indian population. The organization has been described by researchers and political figures as part of Canada's contemporary white-nationalist movement.

== Events ==
=== All Canada Sikh Convention (1983) ===
In 1983, the All Canada Sikh Convention (ACSC) in Ottawa, Ontario took place which had focus on "racial discrimination" against the Sikh community. The ACSC alleged they had documented over 100 incidents over the three previous years.

== See also ==
- Sikhism in Canada
- Indo-Canadians
- South Asian Canadians in Greater Vancouver
- Sikh Heritage Month
- Pajeet
