= Anti-Chinese riots =

Anti-Chinese riots may refer to:

== In Asia ==
- 1740 Batavia massacre, Dutch East Indies
- 1967 anti-Chinese riots in Burma
- 13 May incident, 1969, Kuala Lumpur
- Wanpaoshan Incident, 1931, Manchuria
- Banjarmasin riot of May 1997, Indonesia
- May 1998 riots of Indonesia

== In North America ==
- Chinese massacre of 1871, Los Angeles
- San Francisco riot of 1877, San Francisco
- Tacoma riot of 1885
- Rock Springs massacre, 1885, Wyoming
- Vancouver anti-Chinese riots, 1886
- Seattle riot of 1886
- Chinese Massacre Cove, 1887, Oregon
- Pacific Coast race riots of 1907, San Francisco, Bellingham, Vancouver
- Anti Chinese Riot of 1880, Colorado
