= Chinese Massacre Cove =

Site of murder in Oregon, U.S.

Chinese Massacre Cove is an area along the Snake River in Wallowa County, Oregon, United States. It is located in the Wallowa–Whitman National Forest and the Hells Canyon National Recreation Area, upriver from the Snake's confluence with the Imnaha River. In May 1887, it was the location of the Hells Canyon Massacre, where up to 34 Chinese gold miners were ambushed, murdered, and robbed.

Location in Hells Canyon
1 Chinese Massacre Cove

== Hells Canyon massacre ==
Hells Canyon massacre
- Part of Anti-Chinese violence in Oregon
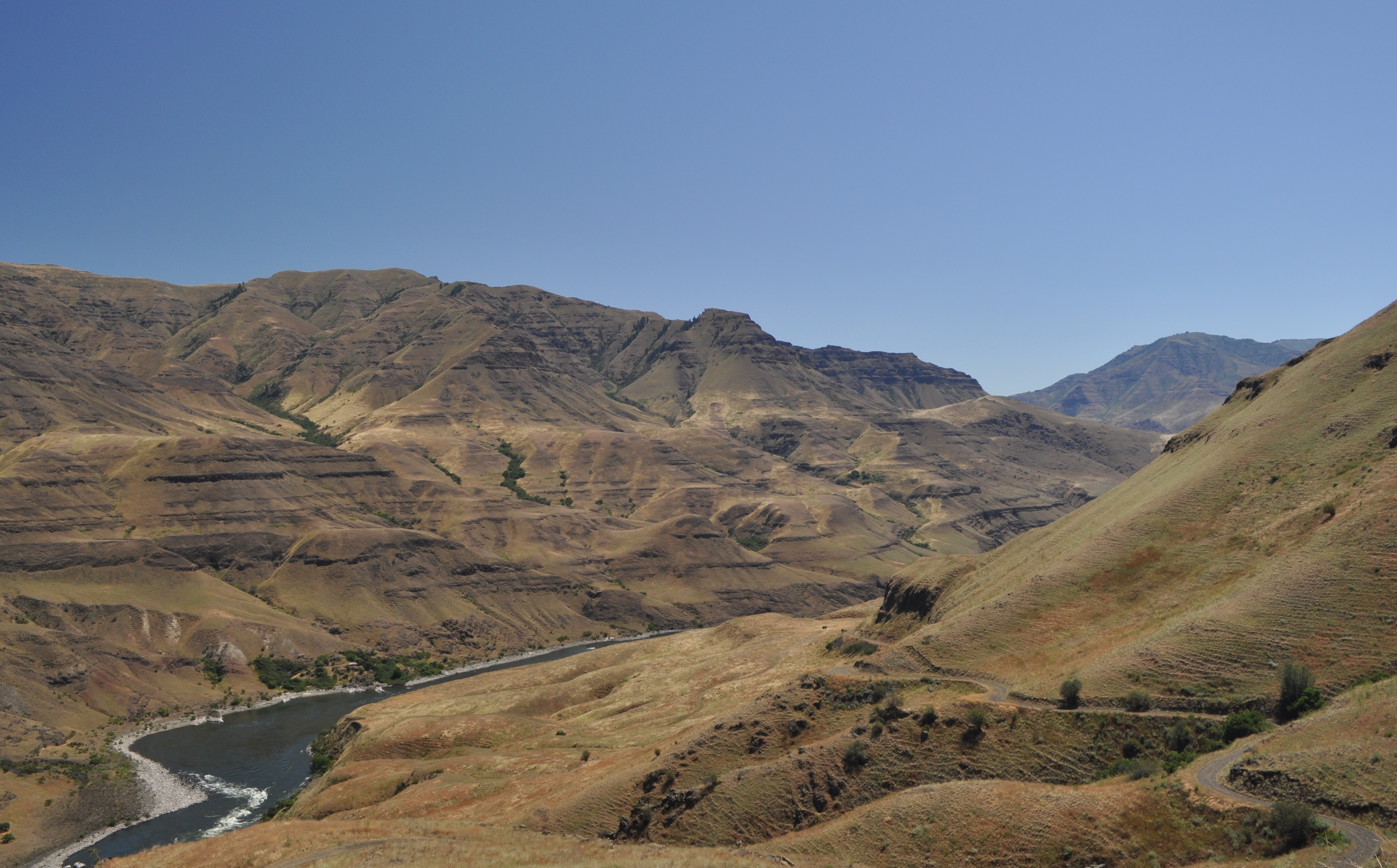
- Hells Canyon and the Snake River, near Dug Bar (2011)
- Date: May 27–28, 1887
- Location: Chinese Massacre Cove, Wallowa County, Oregon, United States; 45.7797222°N 116.6650000°W
- Caused by: Greed
- Goals: Exclusion, gold theft
- Methods: Ambush, mass shooting

Parties
Horse thieves	Chinese gold-miners

Number
4–7	34

Casualties and losses
None	10–34

Casualties
- Deaths: 10–34
- Arrested: 3
- Charged: none
- Fined: none

Locations in Hells Canyon
1 Chinese Massacre Cove & Robinson Gulch (Chea Po)
2 Dug Bar (fording location)
3 Salt Creek (Lee She)
4 Lime Point
5 Log Cabin Island (now Lower Granite Dam)
6 Penawawa, Washington

The Hells Canyon massacre (also known as the Snake River massacre) was a massacre where 34 Chinese goldminers were ambushed and murdered in May 1887. In 2005, the area was renamed Chinese Massacre Cove because of this.

Two groups of Chinese miners, led by Chea Po and Lee She, departed Lewiston in October 1886 and headed upriver along the Snake into Oregon's Hells Canyon to search for gold. Chea's group stopped on the Oregon side of the Snake, near Robinson Gulch and the cove where Deep Creek empties into the Snake. Lee's group continued upriver to Salt Creek. Chea Po had chosen a location just upstream of Dug Bar, a ford used by horse and cattle thieves to cross the Snake. Dug Bar was named for Thomas J. Douglas, a thief who had used the area to graze his horses. Douglas was killed in 1883, and a gang led by Bruce Evans, known locally as "Old Blue", began using Douglas's abandoned cabin in the spring of 1887, about 1/2 mile (0.80 km) downstream from Chea Po's camp. The gang consisted of Evans, J.T. ("Tigh") Canfield, C.O. (Homer) LaRue, Frank Vaughn, Carl (or Hezekiah) Hughes, Hiram Maynard, and Robert McMillan, a 15-year-old boy.

In late May 1887, May 25 according to Stratton, the gang of seven white horse gang members robbed, murdered, and mutilated between 10 and 34 Chinese employees of the Sam Yup Company, reportedly for their gold. Estimates of the value of gold stolen range from $4,000 to $50,000. According to a contemporaneous news article, the gold dust was given to Canfield for safekeeping, but he double-crossed the rest of the gang and fled the county.

The brutality of the Snake River atrocity was probably unexcelled, whether by whites or Indians, in all the anti-Chinese violence of the American West. After the first day's onslaught at Robinson Gulch, the killers wrecked and burned the camp and then threw the mutilated corpses into the Snake River. The bodies of the other Chinese received similar treatment. Since it was the high-water stage of the spring runoff, the dead Chinese were found for months (some accounts say for years) afterwards along the lower river.

— David H. Stratton, The Snake River Massacre of Chinese Miners, 1887 (1983), p.117

Robert McMillan made a deathbed confession to his father Hugh recounting details of the massacre, which were published in 1891. According to Hugh McMillan, the Chinese miners were ambushed by a party consisting of Robert McMillan, Bruce Evans, J. T. Canfield, Max Larue, and Frank Vaughn in late April 1887. Hiram Maynard and Carl Hughes were traveling with the others, but did not participate in the ambush. Canfield and Larue first attacked the camp of 13 Chinese from the bluffs overlooking the cove, driving them towards Evans and Vaughn, who were in the path of their retreat. Twelve Chinese were killed in the initial fusillade, then the remaining man had "his brains beaten out". The assailants stole gold dust worth $5,500.

The next day, eight more Chinese returned to the camp by boat, where the gang shot and killed them, throwing the 21 bodies into the Snake River. The gang then stole the boat and traveled 4 miles (6.4 km) to the next Chinese camp, where they killed 13 more and retrieved $50,000 in gold. Hugh McMillan stated that Robert was present only for the first day's events, but the gang had discussed the next day's plans before Robert left the others.

According to a modern account, Vaughn stayed behind to prepare dinner, while the other six rode to ambush the miners. McMillan minded the horses; Canfield and LaRue shot from the rim of Robinson Gulch, while Evans shot from the river level; Hughes and Maynard were positioned upstream and downstream to catch any miner who tried to flee along the river. Their surprise attack was successful, and all 10 of the miners at the camp were killed, the last with a rock after the gang had run out of ammunition. The remainder of the modern account agrees with McMillan's deathbed confession; the gang returned to the Douglas cabin and restocked their ammunition, then on next day, Evans, Canfield, and LaRue ambushed a group of eight Chinese miners who returned to the cove, and finally sailed to a second camp, where they killed 13 more miners.

=== Horner and Findley accounts ===
Recently, attempts to formulate an accurate picture of the event were drawn from hidden copies of trial documents that contained grand jury indictment, depositions given by the accused, notes from the trial, and historical accounts of Wallowa County by J. Harland Horner and H. Ross Findley.

Horner and Findley were both schoolboys at the time of the massacre, but their accounts had glaring discrepancies. Findley believed the massacre was a planned event with more than just a motive to steal gold from the Chinese miners. He believed the arrested culprits wanted to eliminate the Chinese miners from the area, as well, which they successfully accomplished. In contrast to most accounts, Findley recalled only 31 confirmed victims, and no mention of a trial was made. Horner, though, believed that the event was a spur-of-the-moment event and affected 34 confirmed victims. The schoolboys initially only planned to steal horses, but they experienced difficulty crossing the river with the stolen horses. When the Chinese miners refused to lend their boats, the boys decided to take the boats by force.

=== The bodies ===
The bodies of some murder victims began washing ashore soon afterward, swept downstream to places as far away as Lime Point (south of the mouth of the Grande Ronde River), Log Cabin Island (now the site of the Lower Granite Dam), and Penawawa, Washington. Each body bore unmistakable markings of great violence; J.K. Vincent, a federal official who investigated the crime, later wrote "every one was shot, cut up, and stripped and thrown in the River." Lee She's group went to visit Chea Po's group at Robinson Gulch in early June 1887, and found three bodies in the deserted, ransacked camp; they fled in terror to Lewiston, where they reported the crimes.

A news article published in July 1887 called the corpses a "severe warning to Chinese miners" and blamed the victims: "More than likely, it was the whites who look with an evil eye upon Chinese intrusion in American mines. The American miner kicks hard at the Chinese miner." Other local Chinese Americans believed that all Chinese miners along the Snake had been killed once the mutilated bodies began to surface. Initially, "a thorough investigation" described in a July 17, 1887, article concluded the Chinese had been murdered by rival Chinese miners, since the victims had been "shot in the back and mutilated by cleavers, a weapon in general use by the Chinese." George S. Craig owned the Douglas cabin and discovered numerous skeletons in the area when he returned to winter his stock in the fall of 1887.

Disagreements can be attributed to the fact that the bodies of the Chinese miners were found downstream after only two weeks. It is unclear whether the bodies were mangled in the course of human manslaughter or was the aftermath of being thrown into turbulent waters. The rapids and brute force of the current could have mangled the bodies against the rocks. However, the Chinese men were confirmed to have been shot because gunshot wounds were found on their bodies. Only 10 bodies were identified on February 16, 1888: Chea-po, Chea-Sun, Chea-Yow, Chea-Shun, Chea Cheong, Chea Ling, Chea Chow, Chea Lin Chung, Kong Mun Kow, and Kong Ngan. Little is known about these identified men.

=== Aftermath ===
Frank Vaughn confessed to the crime in 1888, and his testimony led to the indictment of the other six gang members on March 23, 1888. In follow-up testimony given on April 16, Vaughn blamed Evans, Canfield, and LaRue for the massacre, and said that Hughes, Maynard, McMillan, and he had not participated. Vaughn himself was arrested on April 18. By the time he was arrested, almost the entire gang had left America, save Vaughn and Hughes.

I guess if they had killed 31 white men, something would have been done about it, but none of the jury knew the Chinamen or cared much about it, so they turned the men loose.

— George S. Craig, undated newspaper interview

Three of the gang (Maynard, McMillan, and Hughes) were brought to trial, but no one was convicted. The trio were arraigned on August 28, 1888, and pleaded not guilty on August 29. Their testimony was consistent with Vaughn's, namely, that blame for the crime fell squarely on Evans, Canfield, and LaRue, all absent. The jury found the three men not guilty on September 1, 1888, following a short trial.

- J. T. Canfield was imprisoned in Kansas for stealing mules and returned to Wallowa County to search for gold after his release. He was noted to be in the area during the trial and moved to Texas before settling in Idaho and opening a blacksmith shop as Charley Canfield.
- Bruce Evans was arrested within a week of the massacre on an unrelated rustling charge. He escaped from custody two weeks later, possibly with the help of Hughes and Vaughn. When he fled, he left two children and his wife behind. His name is engraved on a memorial arch in the courthouse square of Enterprise, Oregon, honoring the early pioneers of the county.
- C. O. LaRue was rumored to have died in a dispute over a card game in California.
- Robert McMillan died of diphtheria in 1888 at the age of 16.

== Memorials and remembrance ==
In 1995, Charlotte McIver discovered a cache of documents relating to the 1888 trial in an old safe being donated to the Wallowa County Museum. When the news came to the attention of R. Gregory Nokes, a reporter for The Oregonian, he began his own research into the massacre, going on to publish a journal article in 2006 and a nonfiction book, Massacred for Gold: The Chinese in Hells Canyon in 2009 after his retirement in 2003 allowed him to conduct research full-time.

The United States Board on Geographic Names officially named the five-acre Deep Creek massacre site to the Chinese Massacre Cove in 2005 over the objections of Wallowa County commissioners. This was the first ever official recognition of the crime.

Each year after that, conferences and healing ceremonies were held at the site by local representatives in remembrance of the murders of the Chinese immigrants victimized in the attack.

In 2012, Nokes organized the Chinese Massacre Memorial Committee (with private funds and donations) to install a granite monument measuring 4 by 5 feet (1.2 by 1.5 m) in May 2012. It was engraved with words in three languages: English, Nez Perce, and Chinese. It was dedicated on June 22, 2012.

Chinese Massacre Cove.
Site of the 1887 massacre of as many as 34 Chinese gold miners. No one was held accountable.
Celmen Waptamaawnin' Toqooxpa 1887 wiwapciyaawnin' Mita' aptit wax piilept celmenm maqsmaqs kicuy pi'lyaw'aat Weet'u 'isii wepsisukin'
華工浴血灘 一八八七年 三十多名金礦華工 在此慘遭殺戳 至今無人入罪

These words stand to represent the silently oppressed population of Chinese, Native Americans, and other minority races in the area who experienced insufficient justice regarding criminal victimization and injustice against their races.

== Cultural influence ==
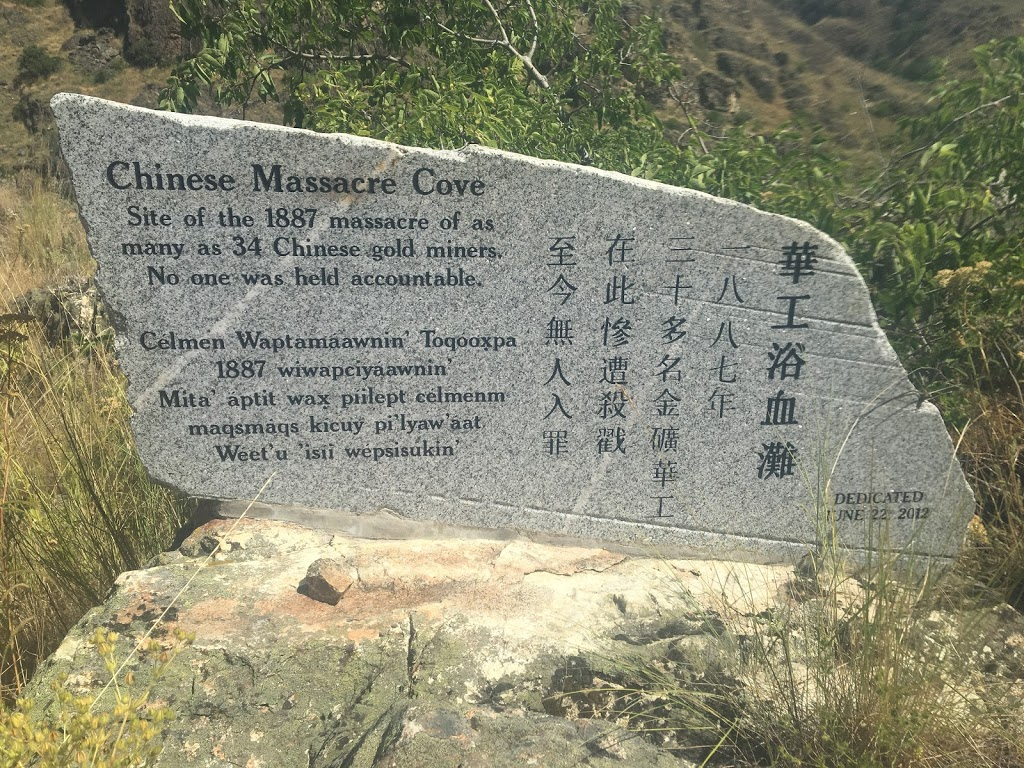
Granite memorial erected in 2012.

Deep Creek, a fictionalized account of the massacre and its aftermath written by William Howarth and Anne Matthews under the pen name "Dana Hand" was published in 2010. It was selected by The Washington Post as one of the best novels of 2010.

Two episodes of the television show Ghost Mine, first aired in October 2013, covered the investigation of paranormal activity at Chinese Massacre Cove.

Peter Ludwin wrote and published a collection of poetry in 2016, Gone to Gold Mountain. He states he was inspired after reading Massacred for Gold, the 2009 book by R. Gregory Nokes.

In 2016, the Oregon Historical Society and Oregon Public Broadcasting produced a 27-minute documentary Massacre at Hells Canyon.

The television show Leverage aired an episode on January 1, 2012, called "The Gold Job" using the story of the Snake River Massacre as the back story for their confidence game.

Two songs from the 2025 album Silent Spike by Ken Woods and the Old Blue Gang deal specifically with the massacre. "Dead Line Creek" provides a more historical overview, while "The Ballade of Old Blue" is based on a lyric from a lost fiddle tune by East Oregonian fiddle player Ike Bare, written shortly after the events.

== See also ==
- List of homicides in Oregon
- Chinese American history
- Anti-Chinese sentiment in the United States
- Chinese Exclusion Act
- Anti-Chinese violence in Oregon
- Chinese massacre of 1871
- Lynching of Asian Americans
- San Francisco riot of 1877
- Rock Springs massacre, 1885
- Attack on Squak Valley Chinese laborers, 1885
- Tacoma riot of 1885
- Seattle riot of 1886
- Pacific Coast Race Riots of 1907
- Bellingham riots of 1907
- Torreón massacre, 1911 in Mexico
