= Asiatic Exclusion League =

Defunct anti-immigration group in the US and Canada

- Predecessor: Japanese and Korean Exclusion League (1905–1907)
- Formation: May 14, 1905; 121 years ago 1907 (Canada)
- Founder: Patrick Henry McCarthy, Olaf Tveitmoe, Andrew Furuseth, Walter Macarthur et al.
- Purpose: Advocate for the prevention of immigration of people of Asian origin to the United States and Canada

The Asiatic Exclusion League (often abbreviated AEL) was an organization formed in the early 20th century in the United States and Canada that aimed to prevent immigration of people of Asian origin.

== United States ==
In May 1905, a mass meeting was held in San Francisco, California to launch the Japanese and Korean Exclusion League. Among those attending the first meeting were labor leaders and European immigrants such as Patrick Henry McCarthy and Olaf Tveitmoe of the Building Trades Council of San Francisco, and Andrew Furuseth and Walter Macarthur of the International Seamen's Union.

Following the first meeting, the San Francisco Chronicle published a picture of laborers who collected at the meeting saying: "Some present owned their own little homes; while a majority know what it is to sit with the good wife of an evening, figure on approaching rent day and make up the cash on hand to see if there is enough to carry the family over to the next day." The Chronicle also mentioned of resilience coming from the men attending the meeting, angrily ranting against the foreign men who were preventing them from owning homes and achieving a middle class life.

In December 1907, the organization was renamed the Asiatic Exclusion League to include the exclusion of Indian and Chinese immigrants in their agenda. Advocating for the "white man's country" and the prohibition of Asian labor immigration, the AEL established branches across the Pacific coast of North America, achieving transnational status and cross-border labor organization. Once the league was started they immediately began working to prevent any increase of Asians along the Western coastlines. The league used strong-arm methods and violence against Asians to try to ensure the rigorous enforcement of the Chinese Exclusion Act and expand its provisions to other Asian immigrants. They moved quickly to broaden their goals and aimed to prevent immigration of all people of East Asian origin. Their collective aims were to spread false anti-Asian information and to sway legislation towards restricting immigration. In response to their efforts General Ulysses S. Webb, Attorney General for the state of California began to apply a markedly greater effort into enforcing laws that prohibited Asian ownership of property.

=== Education ===
AEL framed a campaign geared towards the San Francisco Board of Education to exclude Japanese and Koreans from public schools. The San Francisco school board ruled in October 1906, that all Japanese and Korean students would be forced to join their Chinese counterparts at the segregated Oriental School which was established some two decades earlier in 1884. Many Japanese Americans challenged the school board's ruling by stating that the segregation of schools went against the Treaty of 1894. The Treaty did not address education; however, it did guarantee that equal rights be given to Japanese Americans. As part of the Japanese Americans' challenge, they secured the right to attend San Francisco public schools, but as part of the Gentlemen's Agreement of 1907, the Japanese government agreed to stop issuing passports to Japanese laborers.

=== Government ===
Applying active pressure on Congress, in March 1907, Congress approved amending existing immigration legislation, thereby allowing President Theodore Roosevelt to issue Executive Order 589 that ended migration by Japanese or Korean laborers from Mexico, Canada, and Hawaii to the continental United States. This was taken together with the Gentlemen's Agreement (1907–1908) with Japan, in which the Japanese government agreed not to issue passports for those laborers seeking work in the United States. This ended the immigration of much-maligned Japanese laborers.

The league enhanced its activities by recruiting members, pledging political candidates to an exclusion law and by attempting to organize all of the western states in a concerted movement that would force Congress to grant their aspirations. For the forces against congress the AEL created a platform of five planks to bring forth to Congress:

"(1) Extending Chinese Exclusion Laws to exclude Japanese and Koreans, except those exempt by the terms of the Chinese Exclusion Act, from the United States and its territories; (2) the members are to pledge not to employ or patronize Japanese or to patronize any person or form employing Japanese or dealing with products coming from such firms; (3) actions of the School Board to adopt a policy segregating Japanese from white children be approved; (4) a campaign calling the attention of the President and Congress to this "menace", be taken over; (5) all labor and civic organizations in the state California are asked to contribute a fixed assessment to the cause."

On May 19, 1913 Governor Hiram Johnson signed the Webb–Haney Act, commonly recognized as Alien Land Law of 1913. These laws limited land leases by "aliens ineligible to citizenship." Consecutive amendments followed Webb-Hartley, passed in 1919 and again in 1920, only further restricted the leasing of land. The latter amendment, represented the most demanding measures this far and was praised to close one and for all any and all loopholes that allowed for Asians to gain ownership. It passed overwhelmingly as a ballot initiative and went into effect on December 9, 1920.

== Canada ==
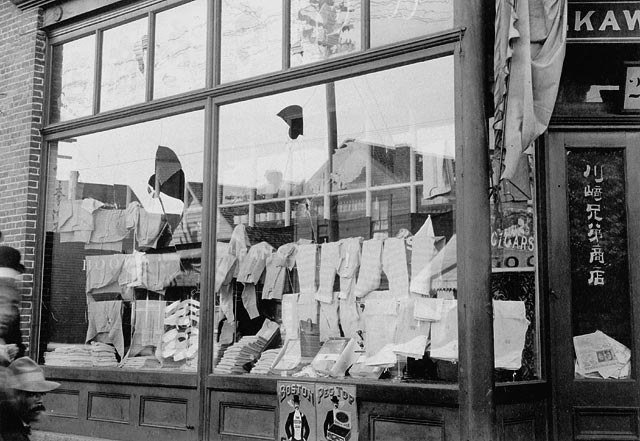
Damage after the September 1907 riot in Vancouver

A sister organization with the same name was formed in Vancouver, British Columbia, on 12 August 1907 under the auspices of the Trades and Labour Council. Its stated aim was "to keep Oriental immigrants out of British Columbia."

On 7 September, riots erupted in Vancouver when League members besieged Chinatown after listening to inflammatory racist speeches at City Hall (then on Main Street near Georgia Street). 4,000 people shouting racist slogans, by the time the riot reached City Hall, it had reached 8,000 people. The crowd marched into Chinatown, vandalizing and causing thousands of dollars' worth of damage. The mob then rampaged through Japantown, where they were confronted by residents armed with clubs and bottles with which they fought back. The organization flourished immediately following the riots, but began to dwindle by the following year. The AEL resurfaced in the early 1920s, this time claiming a membership of 40,000 in the province in the period leading up to the passage of the Chinese Immigration Act of 1923, which ended virtually all Chinese immigration to Canada.

In August 1921, there was a meeting held by the AEL bringing together church leaders, businessmen and veterans from World War I as well as representatives from six trade unions and the Vancouver Trades and Labour Council. During this meeting the League issued a program that called for the abolition of all Oriental immigration which later led to a campaign resulting in the Oriental Exclusion Act of 1923.

Another important, albeit indirect, consequence of AEL activity was that the 1907 Vancouver riots led to the first drug law in Canada. The Minister of Labour (and future Prime Minister), William Lyon Mackenzie King, was sent to investigate the riots as well as victim claims for compensation. One claim was submitted by opium manufacturers, which sparked an investigation into the local drug scene by King. Particularly alarming to the minister was that opium consumption was apparently spreading to young white women. A federal law was soon passed "prohibiting the manufacture, sale and importation of opium for other than medicinal purposes."

Both Asiatic Exclusion Leagues were the product of an overall atmosphere of white racism against Asians that prevailed in Canada and the United States from the 1800s on, culminating in the imposition of a head tax and other immigration policies designed to exclude Asians from Canada, as well as Japanese American internment and Japanese Canadian internment during World War II.

== Further references ==
In 1908, the Asiatic Exclusion League reprinted the 1901 pamphlet "Some reasons for Chinese exclusion. Meat vs. Rice. American Manhood against Asiatic Coolieism. Which shall survive?" published by the American Federation of Labor, adding an introduction and appendices.

== See also ==
- Sinophobia and Yellow Peril
- Anti-Jap Laundry League
- Chinese Hand Laundry Alliance
- Chinese head tax in Canada
- Chinese Exclusion Act of 1882, United States
- Scott Act, 1888 and Geary Act, 1892
- California Alien Land Law of 1913
- Chinese Immigration Act of 1885, Canada
- Chinese Immigration Act, 1923, Canada
- Chinese massacre of 1871
- San Francisco riot of 1877
- Rock Springs massacre, 1885
- Attack on Squak Valley Chinese laborers, 1885
- Tacoma riot of 1885
- Seattle riot of 1886
- Vancouver anti-Chinese riots, 1886
- Hells Canyon massacre, 1887
- Pacific Coast Race Riots of 1907
- Bellingham riots of 1907
- Torreón massacre, 1911 in Mexico
- Anti-Oriental riots (Vancouver)
- Anti-Chinese sentiment in the United States
- Anti-Chinese violence in Oregon
- Anti-Chinese violence in California
- Anti-Chinese violence in Washington
- Chinese Exclusion Repeal Act of 1943, only fully repealed in 1965
- Takao Ozawa v. United States
- United States v. Bhagat Singh Thind
