= Deep Creek (2010 novel) =

2010 novel by Dana Hand

- Author: Dana Hand, pen name of: William Howarth; Anne Matthews
- Subject: Hells Canyon Massacre
- Set in: Idaho Territory, late 1880s
- Publisher: Houghton Mifflin Harcourt
- Publication date: February 10, 2010
- Media type: Print / Digital
- Pages: 320
- ISBN: 978-0-547-23748-0 (1st ed)
- LC Class: PS3608
- Website: Official website

Deep Creek is a historical fiction novel written and published in 2010 under the pen name Dana Hand recounting the aftermath of the Hells Canyon Massacre. Ten to thirty-four Chinese gold miners working for the Sam Yup Company were massacred by a gang of four to seven Caucasian horse thieves in May 1887, who stole approximately $50,000 in gold from the miners. The novel details the hunt for the killers, led by agents hired by the Sam Yup Company.

== Plot summary ==
After the bodies of more than thirty Chinese gold miners are discovered floating in a creek in the Idaho Territory, their employer, the Sam Yup Company, hires Joe Vincent, a local law enforcement agent, to accompany Lee Loi, another employee of Sam Yup, to track down the murderers. They are led by Grace Sundown, a Métis mountain guide.

== Development ==
Dana Hand is the pen name used by the writing team of William Howarth, professor emeritus at Princeton University, and Anne Matthews, a college lecturer. Howarth learned about the real-life Hells Canyon Massacre in 1981 while on assignment for National Geographic. After performing years of research, Howarth wrote a draft of the novel in 2004. After reading that draft, Matthews created an improved version, and agreed to co-write the book with Howarth. The writing team states they "wanted to honor [the slain miners] by getting all the details right [...] Idaho has never faced the moral depravity of that crime: over 30 immigrants tortured, mutilated, and killed in terrible ways. Why? Because the killers were greedy, bored, and did not see Asians as fully human. We wanted to make readers see how people can be so cruel, what it takes to hunt them down, and how an all-male, all-white jury could still acquit."

=== Publishing history ===
- — (2010). Deep Creek. Houghton Mifflin Harcourt. pp. 288. ISBN 978-0-547-38653-9. (1st, pbk)
- — (2010). Deep Creek. Houghton Mifflin Harcourt. p. 320. ISBN 978-0-547-48857-8. (1st, open eBook)
- — (2010). Deep Creek. Houghton Mifflin Harcourt. ISBN 978-1-5226-7134-3. (audiobook)
- — (2010). Deep Creek. Houghton Mifflin Harcourt. ISBN 978-0-547-23748-0.

The February 2010 publication of Deep Creek followed a nonfiction account of the same massacre, published in 2009 by R. Gregory Nokes, entitled Massacred for Gold: The Chinese in Hells Canyon. Dana Hand are writing their next novel, tentatively titled Shadow Falls, set in 1947 Princeton, New Jersey, and featuring descendants from characters in Deep Creek.

== Reception ==
Carolyn See reviewed the novel for The Washington Post, calling it "a gripping, spooky historical novel, told in a way that closely resembles real life". William Wong wrote the novel was "a splendid read" in his review for the San Francisco Chronicle. However, Ellen Urbani faulted the fictionalized elements of historical people and the pace of the plot in her review for The Oregonian noting "... this is their first novel. It shows."

=== Awards ===
Deep Creek was chosen as one of the ten best novels of the year in 2010 by The Washington Post and nominated for the 2011 Dayton Literary Peace Prize.
