= 1907 Vancouver anti-Asian riots =

Riots against Canadians of Asian descent in Vancouver

Anti-Oriental Riots
- Part of the Pacific Coast race riots of 1907
- Location: Chinatown and Japantown; Vancouver, British Columbia

Casualties
- Death: None confirmed
- Injuries: Unknown
- Arrested: At least 19

The Vancouver riots occurred September 7–9, 1907, in Vancouver, British Columbia, Canada. At about the same time there were similar anti-Asian riots in Bellingham, Washington, San Francisco, and other West Coast cities. They were not coordinated but instead reflected common underlying anti-immigration attitudes. Agitation for direct action was led by labour unions and small business. Damage to Asian-owned property was extensive.

== Causes of riots ==
In the early years of the twentieth century race relations on the Pacific Coast of Canada were strained. There were an estimated 16,000 Chinese immigrants in the province at the 1901 census, an increase from the prior 1881 (4,350) and 1891 (8,910) counts. There were also 8,000 Japanese and around 5,000 South Asians. The Chinese had come to Canada to build the railways; the Japanese to fish; and Indians to farm and log.

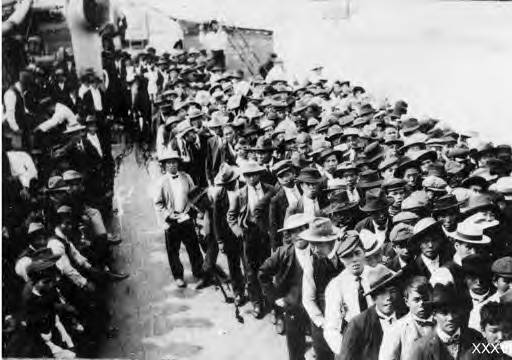
Japanese immigrants arriving from Kumeric, 1907

At this time, other ships with more migrants were arriving, including the Suian Maru [83 Japanese, 1906], SS Kumeric [1,177 Japanese, 1907], SS Tartar [514 Indians, 1907], and the SS Monteagle [901 Indians, further 100 in 1908]. Meanwhile, the Panic of 1907, caused by the failure of Augustus Heinze's brother's bank in New York, exacerbated the difficult labour market and brought racial tensions to the fore.

White people perceived Asians as taking their jobs. Australia had enacted the Immigration Restriction Act 1901 which promulgated the White Australia policy and eliminated Asian immigration shortly after federation. The Asian Exclusion League in Canada lobbied for Canada to do the same.

The riots that broke out on September 7, 1907, were the accumulation of growing enmity toward the Asian immigrants that were coming to the United States and parts of Canada. "By the end of October 1907, new arrivals totaled 11,440. Of these immigrants the Japanese accounted for 8,125, the Chinese 1,266, and the Punjabi Sikhs 2,049". As the numbers of Asian immigrants continued to grow, anti-Asian activists began to feel threatened that the Japanese could "ultimately control [Vancouver] part of Canada". The riots represented the voices and feelings of anti-Asian activists, in attempt to "convince federal authorities of the seriousness of anti-Japanese sentiment in British Columbia".

== Events ==
The 1907 Vancouver riot was the second act of anti-Asian violence in the history of Vancouver; the first incident took place in the area of Coal Harbour, in 1887. A riot targeting East Indian lumber workers in Bellingham in 1907 started the events. Shortly thereafter, tensions flared in the north and angry mobs stormed through Powell Street in Vancouver's Chinatown, breaking windows and assaulting Chinese people in the streets. The riot lasted three days in September 1907; finally the Vancouver police closed the streets and calm slowly returned. Many windows were broken and the population was terrified. The second day of the riot turned against the Japanese community. There were similar actions in Steveston in Richmond against the Japanese.

=== Immediate lead-up ===
Early in 1907 the Grand Trunk Pacific Railway lobbied Ottawa to let it import 10,000 Japanese workers to build its line in Northern BC [this figure is often misquoted as 50,000]. Attorney-General (later Premier) Bowser did not like such large numbers and opposed such a large Asian influx. On August 12, 1907, members of the Asiatic Exclusion League met and developed a resolution. The document asked the Canadian government to "enforce the Immigration Act passed by the provincial legislature in the Spring of 1907", but the Canadian Government refused to endorse the proposed act.

At about the same time there were similar anti-Asian riots in San Francisco, Bellingham, Washington, and other West Coast cities. They were not coordinated, but instead reflected common underlying anti-Asian nativism. The Vancouver riots were a direct result of the race riot in Bellingham, Washington, on September 5, 1907. Many Chinese victims of the Bellingham race riots fled to Canada, subsequently fuelling the Asiatic Exclusion League of Vancouver to take a stance against further Asian immigration.

=== Parade and riot ===
At the third meeting, members of the Asiatic Exclusion League decided to plan a parade for Saturday, September 7, which would include a band in order to draw attention. The parade would lead to Vancouver City Hall at Hastings and Main (then named Westminster), next to Chinatown, where a rally would be held to address the issues of Asian Immigration. 10,000 Canadian and American citizens marched in that anti-Asian immigration parade, which resulted in a mob rioting throughout Chinese and Japanese neighbourhoods within Vancouver.

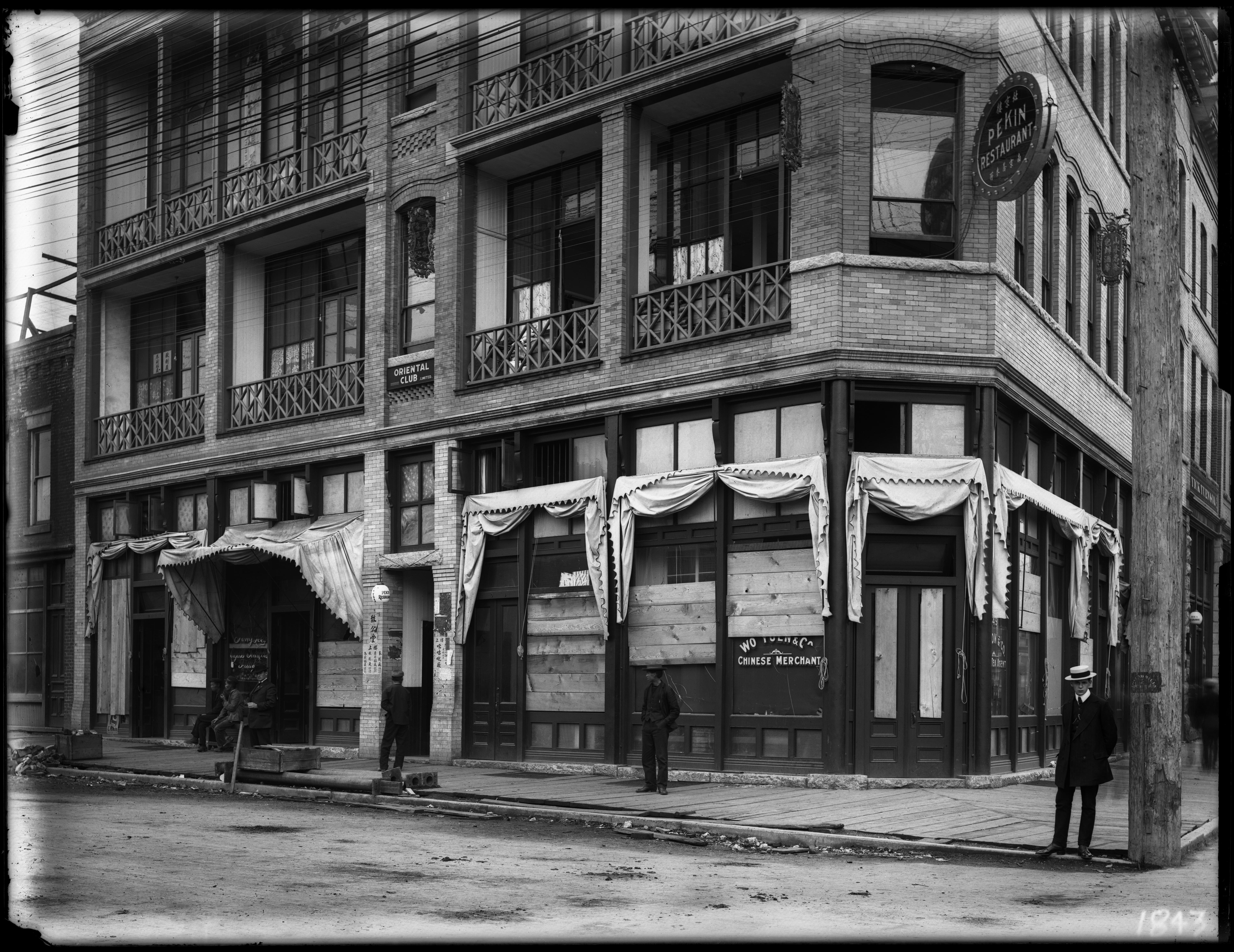
Boarded windows and storefronts on Pender Street in Chinatown after the September 1907 riots

As various speakers were discussing the Bellingham riot, the sound of shattering glass caused by a rock tossed by an unruly teen, sounded the beginning of what would become a much larger riot in Vancouver. The crowd gathered at the parade turned into a rioting mob, throwing beer bottles and rocks at windows, attempting to destroy Chinese owned stores and homes. Most of the buildings attacked during the Vancouver riots were Caucasian owned.

After destroying Chinese business and homes, the mob of rioters moved to Japantown. Four waves of attacks ensued, with the rioters being repulsed by the armed Japanese residents. In spite of the defenders inflicting a number of injuries upon the attacking mob, more than 50 stores and businesses in the Japanese district on Powell Street had their windows broken, resulting in thousands of dollars of damage. The Vancouver riot did not finish until 3 am on September 8; by the time dawn had broken, the city was quiet.

Punjabis were initially targeted but “sent attacking white mobs fleeing” as majority of the Punjabis were former soldiers of the Sikh regiment and Punjab regiments, many of whom even after retirement and migrating to Canada, kept their service muskets and bayonets and at the minimum, daggers and swords in their households, often ceremonial religious swords which had been kept as sidearms during war.

The morning after the riots stopped, Ng Ah Sim, a farm worker from South Vancouver, was found hanging in a tree. His death was ruled a suicide by the coroner, but articles published in Chinese language newspapers indicated the community believed otherwise.

== Aftermath ==
Labour Minister MacKenzie King was appointed to conduct a Royal Commission into the events. He also recompensed the damage with $26,000 to the Chinese-Canadian community and $9,000 for the Japanese-Canadian community.

The Vancouver race riot resulted in bans on immigration for Japanese people. This ban was titled the "gentlemen's agreement" and was enacted in Canada on January 25, 1908. Within this treaty Japan agreed to "restrict the number of passports issued to make labourers and domestic servants to an annual maximum of 400". In addition to the "gentlemen's agreement", Canada also passed the continuous journey regulation, which further restricted immigration from Asia through immigration bans applied to people whose "journey" to Canada was not "continuous", that is, those whose travel from their home country included a stopover in another country; this acted as a further effective de facto restriction on immigrants from Asia.

Although spared the worst of the riots by remaining indoors and fighting back, the aftermath nevertheless affected Indians living in the province. In 1908 the British Columbia government passed a law preventing South Asian men from voting. Because eligibility for federal elections originated from provincial voting lists, they were also unable to vote in federal elections. The Canadian government also enacted a $200 head tax on Indian immigrants, and required immigrants to take a continuous journey from their country of origin to Canada; there were no boats which sailed directly from India to Canada. After 1908, yearly South Asian immigration to Canada did not exceed 80 until the 1940s. A direct result of these restrictions set the stage for one of the most infamous events in Vancouver history, the "Komagata Maru Incident" in 1914.

== See also ==
- Royal Commission on Chinese Immigration (1885)
- Chinese Immigration Act, 1885
- 1886 Vancouver anti-Chinese riots
- Chinese Immigration Act, 1923
- 1907 Bellingham race riot
- Pacific Coast race riots of 1907
- History of Vancouver
