= Walter Macarthur =

American labor leader

- Macarthur c. 1910

United States Shipping Commissioner
- In office 1913–1932
- Appointed by: William C. Redfield

Personal details
- Born: March 9, 1862 Glasgow, Scotland
- Died: December 8, 1944 (aged 82) San Francisco, California, U.S.
- Resting place: Cypress Lawn Memorial Park
- Party: Democratic; Union Labor
- Spouse: Annabelle Lyle Hunter (m. 1928)
- Occupation: Labor leader; writer; shipping commissioner
- Known for: Coast Seamen's Journal; Asiatic Exclusion League

Military service
- Allegiance: United Kingdom; United States
- Branch/service: British Merchant Navy; U.S. Merchant Marine

Walter Macarthur (March 9, 1862 – December 8, 1944) was a Scottish-American labor leader and writer who served nearly twenty years as a United States Shipping Commissioner. He was one of the founders of the Sailors' Union of the Pacific, and was the longtime editor of its official organ, the Coast Seamen's Journal. He was involved with the San Francisco Union Labor Party before disavowing it over its corruption, and was a co-founder of the Asiatic Exclusion League. In 1910 he ran for Congress against Julius Kahn.

== Works ==
- Coast Seamen's Journal
