= List of mayors of Bellingham, Washington =

The following is a list of mayors of the city of Bellingham, Washington state, United States.

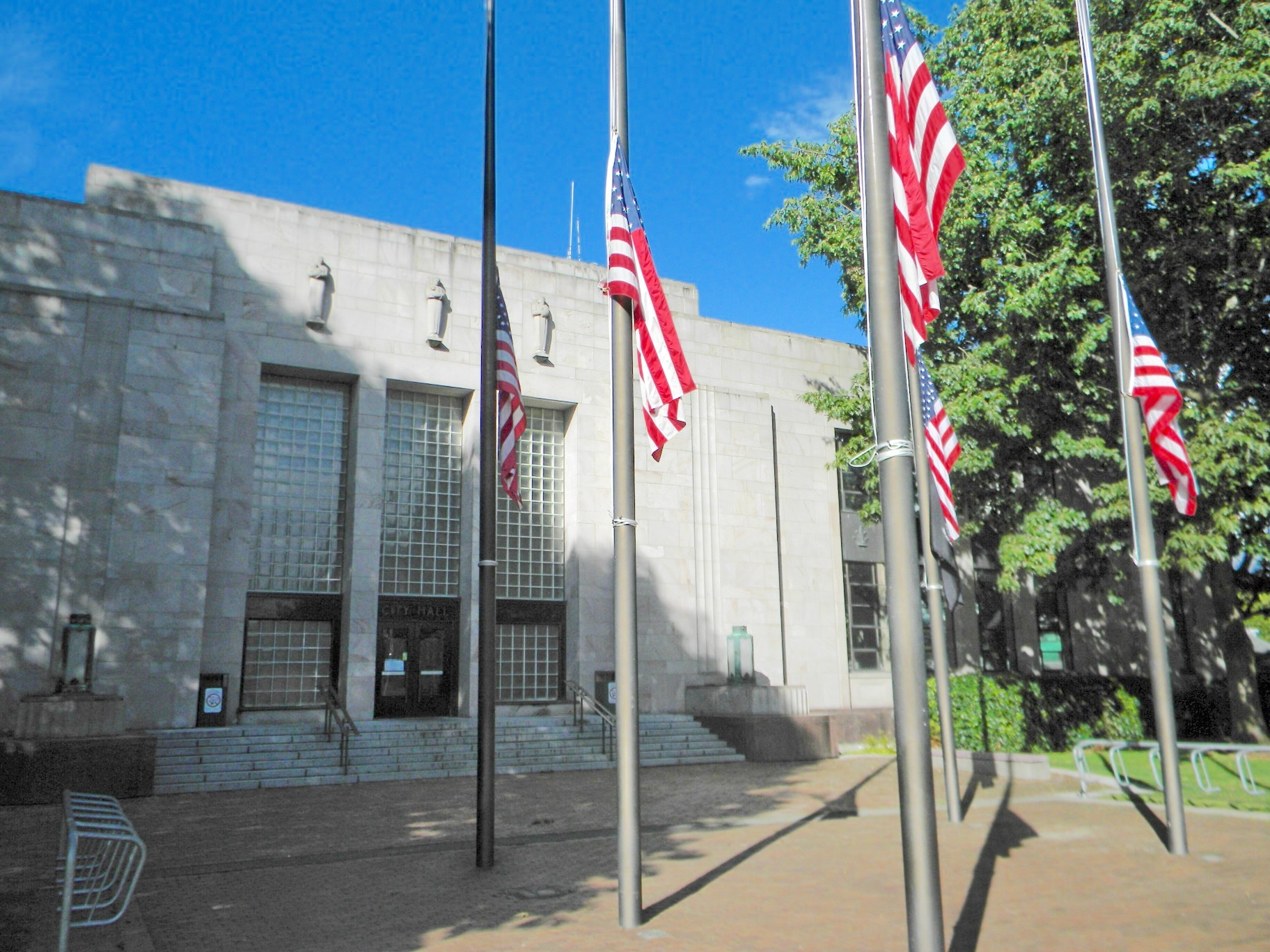
City hall in Bellingham (2013)

- J.W. Romaine, 1904–1905
- A.L. Black, 1906–1907
- James P. deMattos, 1908–1911, 1914–1915
- Edward J. Cleary, 1912–1913
- A.M. Muir, 1916–1917
- J.A. Sells, 1918–1920
- E.T. Mathes, c.1920–1923
- John A. Kellogg, 1924–1933
- Burleigh E. Hanning, 1934–1935
- Wm P. Brown, 1936–1937
- Burleigh E. Hanning, 1938–1941
- Arthur H. Howard, c.1942–1947
- Don E. Satterlee, 1948
- J.W. Mulhern, 1950
- Sigurd Hjaltalin, c.1952–1955
- John Westford, c.1956–1965
- Reginald Williams, 1968–1975
- Ken Hertz, 1976–1982
- Tim Douglas, 1984–1995, 2006–2007
- Mark Asmundson, 1996–2006
- Dan Pike, 2007–2011
- Kelli Linville, 2012–2019
- Seth Fleetwood, 2020–2023
- Kim Lund, 2024–present

== See also ==
- Bellingham City Hall building
- History of Bellingham, Washington
- City government in Washington (state)
