= Bellingham City Hall =

- U.S. National Register of Historic Places
- Location within Washington (state)
- Location: 210 Lottie St., Bellingham, Washington
- Coordinates: 48°45′17″N 122°28′44″W
- Built: 1939
- Architect: Leonard W. Bindon
- Architectural style: Art Deco
- NRHP reference No.: 11000987
- Added to NRHP: December 30, 2011

Bellingham City Hall is a historic building located in the northern end of downtown Bellingham, Washington. The building was completed in 1939. It was added to the National Register of Historic Places in December 2011.

== History ==
Before this building was completed, the original city hall for New Whatcom was located at Prospect Street. This building is part of what is now known as the Whatcom Museum.

Talks for the building of a new city hall began in April 1938, headed by the Bellingham Planning Commission. Original cost for the building by architect Leonard William Bindon (1899-1980) was estimated to be $300,000 to $350,000. Emil Selene was hired on by the city to be inspector of the project. Originally O. F. Nelson was recommended to be inspector, however pushback occurred as Nelson had recently moved to Bellingham from Seattle.

The city received a grant of $192,933 from the Public Works Administration in July 1938 to fund the project. This grant funded about 45% of the cost the project, which totaled about $450,000 when construction started. City council pushed for the labor to be entirely local with a city ordinance. However, the PWA offices in Portland ordered for this ordinance to be rescinded. The general construction contact was awarded to S. S. Mullen Inc. of Seattle with a bid of $272,706. F.M. Haskell Plumbing and Heating of Bellingham was awarded the plumbing and heating contract. Meacham and Babcock of Seattle was awarded the electrical contract. Ground was broken on October 28, 1938 with a number of speakers and events to celebrate the occasion.

The building was completed on December 21, 1939. The first citizen to enter city hall after it was opened at 8 a.m was Jack Covalt, a local barber who was paying his water bill. The city jail, located on the second floor, held 3 prisoners upon opening. The building was added to the National Register of Historic Places on December 30, 2011.

== See also ==
- List of mayors of Bellingham, Washington
