= Sikh Heritage Month =

Commemorative month in Canada

- Observed by: Canada
- Significance: Celebration of Sikh arts, culture and heritage of the Canadian Sikh community
- Begins: 1 April
- Ends: 30 April
- Date: April (Canada)
- Duration: 1 month
- Frequency: Annual
- Started by: Jagmeet Singh (2013 Provincial) Sukh Dhaliwal (2017 National) Approved by Government of Canada

Sikh Heritage Month is an annually observed commemorative month in Canada. It is the celebration of Sikh arts, culture and heritage of the Canadian Sikh community. Sikh Heritage Month is celebrated in April in Canada, where it has received official recognition from the Government of Canada.

== History ==
In 2013, the Legislative Assembly of Ontario made history by proclaiming April as Sikh Heritage Month in Ontario through Bill 52 put forward by Jagmeet Singh, who was Member of Provincial Parliament at the time. This was the first global recognition that celebrates Sikh arts, culture and heritage.

In October 2017, Liberal MP Sukh Dhaliwal introduced Bill 376 for Sikh Heritage Month to be recognised on a country-wide level. Dhaliwal received royal assent from Governor General Julie Payette in November 2018, which officially made Canada the first country to create Sikh Heritage Month. It also received approval in the Senate of Canada in April 2019.

== Events ==
=== Nagar Kirtan ===
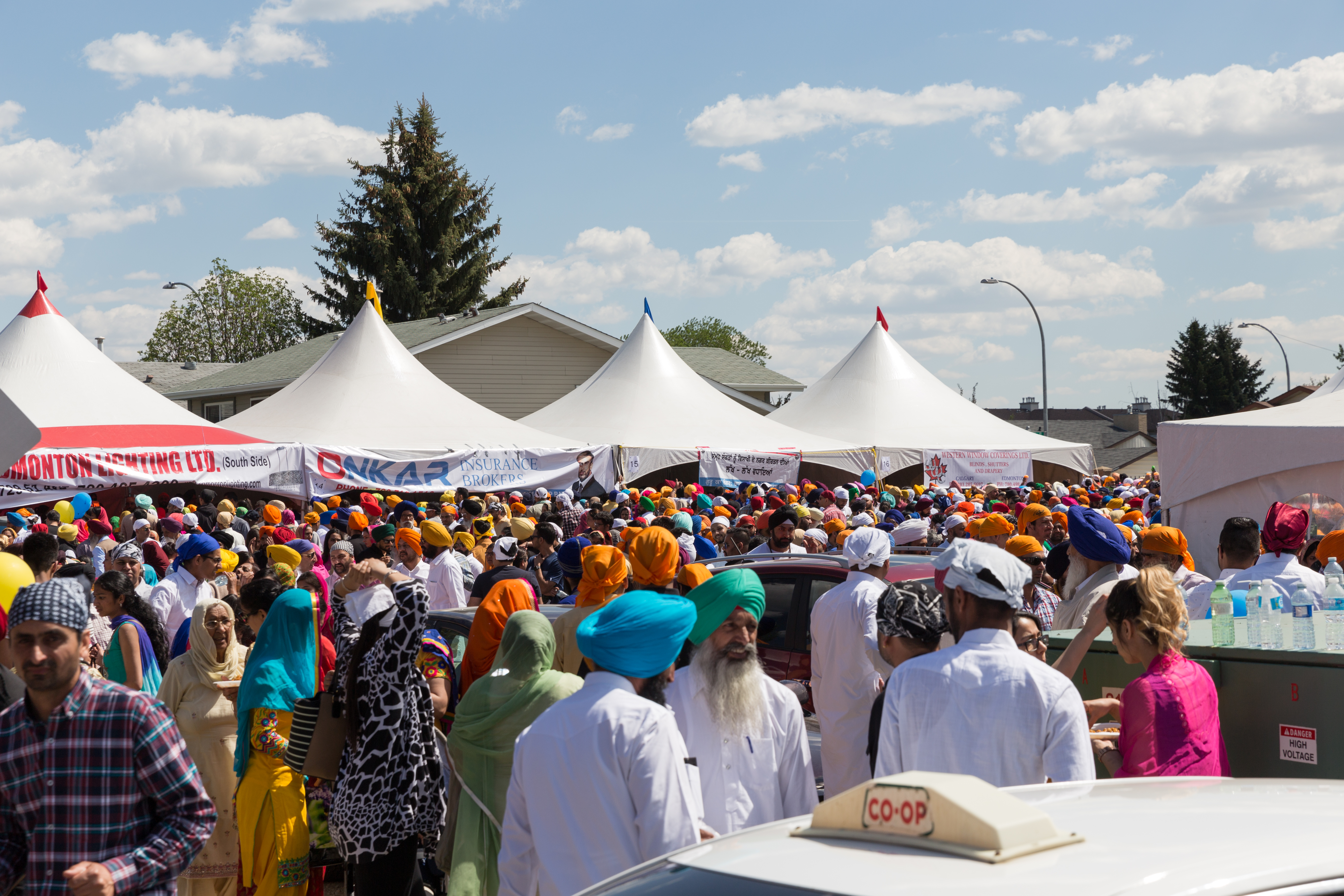
Vaisakhi Nagar Kirtan Sikh Parade in Edmonton, Alberta

Sikh Heritage Month plays an important role in supporting and promoting Canadian Nagar kirtan, a religious procession usually held in April, coinciding with Vaisakhi. This procession also highlights Canadian Sikh culture, attracting large community participation particularly in Surrey, British Columbia.

In 2025, it was reported that the Surrey Nagar Kirtan had over 550,000 attendees, making it the largest global Vaisakhi procession.

=== Museums and exhibitions ===
In 2023, the "Treasure of Sikh Heritage" exhibit was displayed at the city hall in Surrey, British Columbia.

During Sikh Heritage Month in April 2024, a free exhibit on Sikh heritage was displayed at Northern College, Ontario, Timmins Public Library and the Timmins Museum.

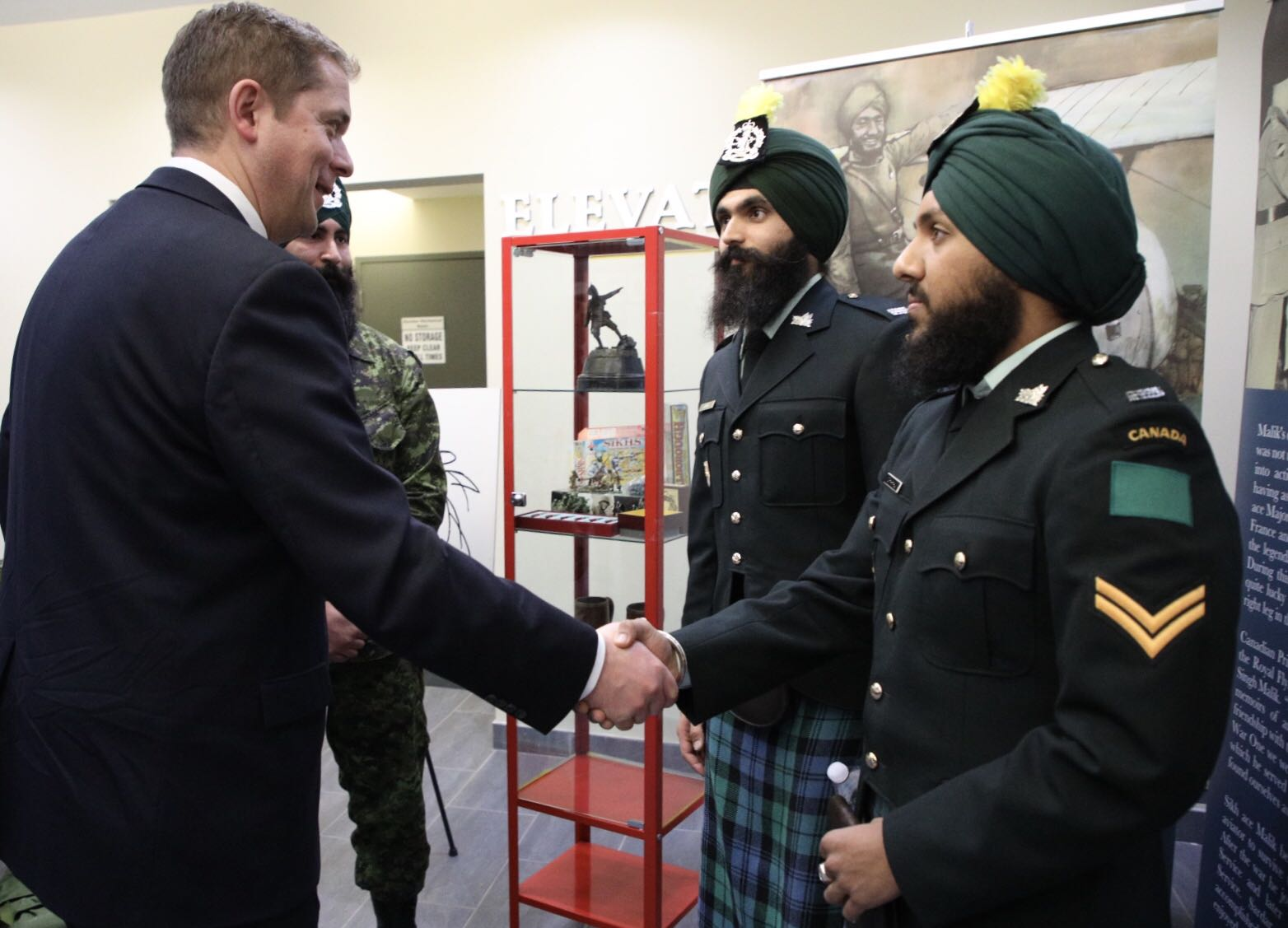
Former Conservative Leader and MP Andrew Scheer at the Sikh Heritage Museum (2018)

In 2024, Sikh Heritage Month in Ontario celebrated the successful launch of the "1984 Path of the Warrior Saints" exhibition drawing over 500 visitors to the Peel Art Gallery, Museum and Archives. The event was co-curated by poet and author Rupi Kaur.

In 2025, The Military Museums celebrated Sikh Heritage Month with an exhibition of contributions of Sikhs in the Canadian Military.

=== Charitable donations ===
In honour of Sikh Heritage Month, UK based non-profit Khalsa Aid organized a food drive, aiming to collect 200,000 meals, with 100,000 meals dedicated to food banks in the Greater Toronto Area. The initiative was inspired by Sikh principles of Seva (selfless service), and supported local food banks facing rising demand amidst growing homelessness and food insecurity.

=== Alcohol and drug free awareness campaign ===
In 2024, the Drug Awareness Society of Toronto (DAST) launched an alcohol-free challenge and a substance abuse awareness campaign during Sikh Heritage Month. The initiative, focusing on the Punjabi-Canadian community in Brampton and surrounding areas, aimed to educate and empower youth and parents about the dangers of alcohol and drug use. It aims to encourage healthier choices through seminars and workshops in both Gurdwaras and schools.

== Recognition ==
Alongside the recognition by the Government of Canada, Provinces and territories of Canada, cities and towns have also marked recognition of Sikh Heritage Month in Canada.

=== National ===
- Canada (recognised in 2017)

=== Provincial ===
- Ontario (recognised in 2013)
- British Columbia (recognised in 2017)
- Alberta (recognised in 2017)
- Manitoba (recognised in 2017)
- Saskatchewan (recognised in 2025)

=== Cities ===
- In 2024, Orangeville, Ontario proclaimed the month of April as Sikh Heritage Month.
- In 2024, City of Vancouver recognised April as Sikh Heritage Month.

== See also ==
- Sikhism in Canada
- List of Sikh festivals
- Anti-Sikh sentiment in Canada
- Sikhism by country
