= Terry Milewski =

Canadian journalist

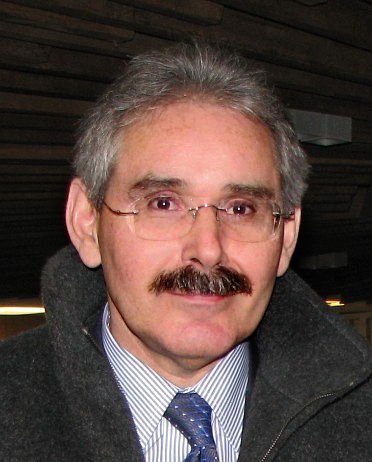
- Milewski at University of Regina in 2009
- Born: 1949 or 1950 (age 76–77)
- Education: Shrewsbury School
- Occupation: Journalist
- Employer: CBC News
- Children: 2

Terry Milewski (born 1949) is a Canadian journalist, who was the senior correspondent for CBC News until his retirement in 2016.

Milewski has reported in television, radio, and print media, from many places around the world. Assignments have included Ottawa, Calgary, Jerusalem, Europe, the Middle East, South America and the United States. He emigrated to Canada from the United Kingdom.

== Early life ==
Milewski's parents immigrated to the United Kingdom before he was born. His father was a Polish medical student who fled Warsaw to serve with the 7th Armoured Division in North Africa. He completed his training in Edinburgh, where he met Milewski's mother, who was the daughter of an Egyptian doctor and a Scottish mother. She grew up in an upper-class family in Alexandria and attended boarding school in Scotland as a child. She was disowned for marrying a non-Muslim.

Milewski was educated at Shrewsbury School, where he won the school's upriver swim. He left the University of Oxford after illness without completing a degree, and later dropped out of Keele University.

== Career ==
After leaving university, Milewski became a lifeguard and a disc jockey, and played in a blues band. He moved to Canada, where he worked first in a sawmill and then at radio stations in Williams Lake and Nanaimo, British Columbia. He joined the CBC as a local reporter in Calgary in 1978, before moving to the national news division as a science reporter in 1980, and as a parliamentary correspondent beginning in 1983.

=== 1998 Asian Pacific Economic Conference protest coverage ===
In 1998, the office of Prime Minister Jean Chrétien complained that Milewski had been "biassed" in his coverage of protests at the 1997 Asian Pacific Economic Conference (APEC) summit in Vancouver, and Milewski was suspended for three days from the CBC. Milewski's investigations of Chretien's possible connections to the RCMP attack on peaceful protesters at the summit were persistent, and the controversy eventually compelled Solicitor General Andy Scott to resign his cabinet post. The alleged bias was found in some remarks in e-mails between Milewski and arrested protester Craig Jones, as well as in providing coverage of protesters' points of view.

The CBC reported that its Ombudsman, Marcel Pepin, over a five-month period, reviewed all of Milewski's TV reporting and communications with sources concerning APEC. He concluded that Milewski's reports "cannot be faulted from the point of view of accuracy and fairness." Pepin found that "...concerns that Milewski was one-sided were not justified." At the time of the finding, the CBC also reported that Milewski was serving an 18-day suspension, but that "...Milewski was not suspended because of his journalism but for other undisclosed reasons." It emerged that these "other" reasons were Milewski's public insistence that his conduct and his reporting were sound. Pepin further credited Milewski with "aggressive and critical journalism" which was valuable both to the journalism community and to the public at large.

=== 2007 Sikh documentary ===
In 2007, Milewski reported in a documentary for the CBC← that a minority within Canada's Sikh community was gaining political influence even while publicly supporting terrorist acts in support of the struggle for an independent Sikh state. The World Sikh Organization (WSO) sued the CBC for "defamation, slander and libel", alleging that Milewski linked it to terrorism and damaged the reputation of the WSO within the Sikh community. The documentary remains unaltered on the CBC website and, in 2015, the WSO unconditionally abandoned "any and all claims" made in its lawsuit.

=== 2011 Canadian federal election ===
After the motion of non-confidence had passed by the House of Commons, at the press conference Milewski accused Michael Ignatieff of not being forthcoming about forming a coalition with the other opposition parties should the ruling Conservatives not win a majority, saying "Surely this coalition monkey is going to stay on your back every day of the campaign? Because people will assume that if you don't rule it out, that's because you’ve got something to hide." Ignatieff maintained "if you want to replace the Harper government, you’ve got to vote Liberal. It can't be clearer than that".

=== 2014 Opposition to reporting on global surveillance revelations ===
In a speech by Glenn Greenwald in Ottawa on 25 October 2014, which was broadcast by C-SPAN, Greenwald and journalist Jesse Brown alleged that Terry Milewski, as a CBC News senior correspondent was responsible for a major CBC resistance into reporting the facts about global surveillance, object of the documents provided by Edward Snowden. Brown claimed that Milewski was ideologically opposed to reporting those facts, regardless the fact that they were being reported widely by all major newspapers all over the world.

In response, Milewski challenged Brown and Greenwald to square their allegations with his actual published critiques of government policy on mass surveillance. One called those plans "Orwellian." Another criticised the lack of parliamentary oversight of Canada's spy agency. A third contradicted then-Prime Minister Stephen Harper's claim that Canada did not use metadata as a surveillance tool. Neither Brown nor Greenwald responded to the challenge.

Milewski retired from the CBC in September 2016, although until 2018 he continued to write for the CBC website and to guest-host the CBC's daily Power and Politics broadcast as a freelancer.

=== 2020 Khalistan article ===
In 2020, Milewski wrote Khalistan: A Project Of Pakistan, an article published by The Macdonald-Laurier Institute. Milewski and MLI were sued by the Sikhs for Justice for defamation, but both Milewski and MLI stood by the article and Sikhs for Justice did not pursue its claim.

In 2021, Milewski wrote a book, titled Blood for Blood - Fifty Years of the Global Khalistan Project. It was published by HarperCollins India.

=== Death threats ===
Terry Milewski, along with his colleague, Kim Bolan, have received death threats and targeting from Sikh separatists.

== Personal life ==
Milewski is married with two children.
