= J. A. Kellogg =

American politician

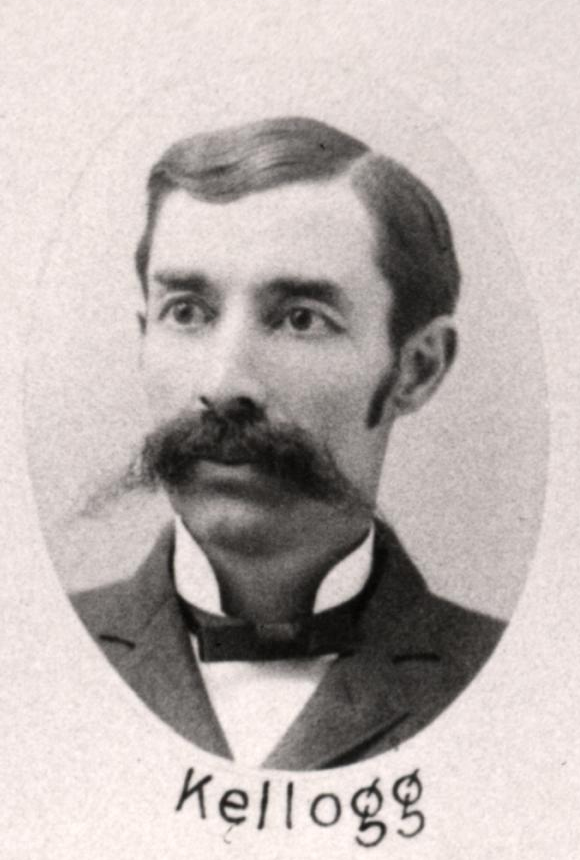
- Kellogg in 1895

Member of the Washington House of Representatives from the 1st district
- In office January 9, 1905 – January 14, 1907
- Preceded by: Martin J. Maloney
- Succeeded by: Z. E. Hayden

Member of the Washington Senate from the 8th district
- In office January 9, 1893 – January 11, 1897
- Preceded by: C. G. Austin
- Succeeded by: J. C. Van Patten

Personal details
- Born: John Alonzo Kellogg; September 17, 1871 Whatcom County, Washington, U.S.
- Died: April 12, 1962 (aged 90) Bellingham, Washington, U.S.
- Party: Republican

John Alonzo Kellogg (September 17, 1871 – April 12, 1962) was an American politician in the state of Washington. He served in the Washington State Senate and Washington House of Representatives. He later served as mayor of Bellingham, Washington and was also a judge.

On July 27 and 28, 1929, the Bellingham Klan chapter hosted the Washington State KKK annual convention, attended by delegates from dozens of Ku Klux Klan chapters. Bellingham Mayor John A. Kellogg addressed the convention while standing in front of an enormous electric cross, and concluded his remarks by presenting Grand Dragon EB Quackenbush from Spokane with the Key to the City. During his speech, Kellogg also acknowledged Bellingham City Attorney Charles B. Sampley, described by the Bellingham Herald as “a prominent Klansman” who the crowd “hailed as a conquering hero."

The arc of the Ku Klux Klan in Whatcom County thus bridged a generation of conservative organizing. It began in the wake of the first Red Scare after World War I, and persisted in ways that foreshadowed the intimidation tactics and character assassination of the new anti-communism that emerged after World War II. In 1941, an American Association of University Professors report criticized Governor Martin for failing to protect academic freedom and for capitulating to the Klan and other supposedly patriotic groups when he had Fisher fired. Martin’s actions showed how much influence a fringe group like the Klan could have. When State Legislator Albert Canwell launched an inquiry in 1948 based on the fanciful claim that 150 of the University of Washington’s 700 professors might be communists, he was following in the footsteps of Blanton Lather and creating a model for Joseph McCarthy’s Cold War hysteria at the same time

== See also ==
- List of mayors of Bellingham, Washington
