= Anti-Jap Laundry League =

The Anti-Jap Laundry League was an organization founded in 1908 in the United States by the Laundry Workers' and Laundry Drivers' Unions. The league, based in San Francisco, attempted to financially harm laundries run by Japanese Americans using four different tactics: picketing laundries, following customers back to their homes and intimidating them, preventing the laundries from purchasing equipment, and threatening public officials who refused to punish the laundries. They successfully ruined many Japanese laundries in this way. In the laundries run by league members, posters such as the following were hung on the walls:

Are our boys and girls wrong
In expecting you who make your living
Exclusively off the white race
To stop patronizing Jap laundries.
And thereby assist your fellow men and women
In maintaining the white man's standard in a white man's country?
Anti-Jap Laundry League.

California Attorney General Ulysses S. Webb put great effort into enforcing laws against Asian ownership of property.

== See also ==
- Anti-Japanese sentiment in the United States
- Asiatic Exclusion League
- Jap
