= William Howarth =

American academic (1940–2023)

William Howarth (November 26, 1940 – June 6, 2023) was an American writer and professor emeritus at Princeton University. He published fourteen books and also wrote for such national periodicals as National Geographic, Smithsonian, The Washington Post, The New York Times, and The American Scholar.

Howarth was born in Minneapolis and grew up in Springfield, Illinois, where his father Nelson Howarth was a progressive, civil-rights mayor. William Howarth received a B.A. from the University of Illinois at Champaign-Urbana and an M.A. and Ph.D. in English from the University of Virginia.

Howarth taught at Princeton from 1966, offering over 60 undergraduate and graduate courses, from "Moby-Dick Unbound" to "Race and Place" and "Darwin in our Time." In 1968 he helped create Princeton's program in Afro-American studies. His teaching has spanned English, American Studies, Environmental Studies, the Center for the Study of Religion, the Davis Center for Historical Studies, and the Freshman Seminars. He advised 100 Ph.D. dissertations and 256 senior theses, and won numerous university awards for research, teaching, and alumni education.

Howarth began his career as a specialist in American literary manuscripts and textual criticism, and in 1972 he became editor in chief of The Writings of Henry D. Thoreau. In 1974-75 he served as 21st president of the Thoreau Society. He published eight books on Thoreau, covering his studies of maps, landscapes, and North American travels. His account of Thoreau as writer, The Book of Concord, is the first critical history of Thoreau's two-million-word Journal.

Howarth later expanded his studies in literary nonfiction to include the fields of autobiography, journalism, trans-Atlantic romanticism, and the literature of place and travel. His critical anthology, The John McPhee Reader, is the first study of John McPhee as literary artist, and it remains a standard text in journalism history.

Howarth was a founding member of the Princeton Environmental Institute and among the earliest scholars to define and explore the field of literary ecocriticism. His essay "Some Principles of Ecocriticism" describes the origins and evolution of this field from early work in ecology, ethics, language, criticism, geography, natural and social sciences, history, literature, American studies, and media. He long served on the editorial boards of Environmental History, Interdisciplinary Studies in Literature and Environment, and was chairman of the board for The Center for American Places.

His first venture into fiction, the historical novel Deep Creek, written with Anne Matthews under the joint pen name Dana Hand, was selected by the Washington Post as one of the best novels of 2010.

Howarth died on June 6, 2023, at the age of 82.
