= World Sikh Organization =

Sikh religious and nonprofit organization

- World Sikh Organization of Canada
- Formation: 1984
- Type: Civil rights law
- Purpose: Human rights advocacy
- Headquarters: Ottawa, Ontario, Canada
- President: Danish Singh
- Website: worldsikh.org

World Sikh Organization of Canada (WSO) is a Sikh religious and nonprofit organization whose 1984 founding goal was "to provide an effective, credible voice to represent Sikh interests on the world stage", after Operation Blue Star. Its stated goal is "to promote and protect the interests of the Sikh Diaspora", and "promote and advocate for" human rights. Danish Singh currently serves as president of the organization. A 2007 statement from the World Sikh Organization stated that they were committed "to strive through peaceful means, for the establishment of a Sikh nation, Khalistan".

== History ==
The World Sikh Organization (WSO) was formed after an international gathering of Sikhs on July 28, 1984 at Madison Square Garden in New York City, New York which included several thousand people from the United States, Canada, Great Britain, and several countries in the far east.

The organisation was formed with two branches, WSO-Canada and WSO-America, and headquarters in Ottawa and New York.

The WSO and is involved in various community issues including the right to wear turbans, right to wear kirpans, and Gurdwara management. WSO officials are chosen through a mix of elections and nominations.

=== Violent speech during the founding convention ===
Ajaib Singh Bagri, a man accused of playing a role in the Air India bombing, and later acquitted, took to the stage and declared "Until we kill 50,000 Hindus, we will not rest" at the WSO's founding convention. Chants from the crowd during the convention included: "Death to them-Hindu dogs", "Long live Khalistan", and "Long live Babbar Khalsa".

== Activities ==
The World Sikh Organization has advocated increased religious freedoms. It helped Baltej Singh Dhillon to fight discrimination and wear a turban in his role as a member of the Royal Canadian Mounted Police. It has also helped Sikhs in Canada in court cases involving the wearing of kirpans. In addition it has supported other groups in asserting their rights, including Orthodox Jewish men wearing the yarmulke, Muslim women wearing the niqab, and a Scottish high school student wearing a kilt to his graduation ceremony.

Hamish Jacobs... should be able to practice his cultural background and honour his Scottish roots...a kilt should be one of those practices that is protected, just like the turban is, just like the yarmulke is.

— Balpreet Singh, Legal Counsel, WSO Canada

WSO has been involved as an intervener in several prominent human rights cases at both the provincial level and at the Supreme Court of Canada, including Syndicat Northcrest v. Amselem [2004] 2 S.C.R. 551 regarding the right of Jewish residents to build succah huts on their condominium balconies and Multani v. Commission scolaire Marguerite-Bourgeoys, [2006] 1 S.C.R. 256, 2006 SCC 6 in which the Supreme Court of Canada affirmed the right of Sikh students to wear kirpans to school.

During Justice John Major's Inquiry into the Air India bombing, the WSO applied for and was granted intervener status, and applied for leave to call witnesses who would testify about the role of Indian intelligence agents in the Sikh community in Canada and information the Government of India may have had about the bombing. In its final submissions to the Inquiry, the WSO expressed its disappointment with the proceedings, including suggestions that there was "inadequate protection of witnesses" from intimidation.

Terry Milewski reported in a 2006 documentary for the CBC that a minority within Canada's Sikh community was gaining political influence even while publicly supporting terrorist acts in the struggle for an independent Sikh state. In response, the WSO sued the CBC for "defamation, slander and libel", alleging that Milewski linked it to terrorism and damaged the reputation of the WSO within the Sikh community. Canadian MP Ujjal Dosanjh and reporter Terry Milewski were also named in the suit for their alleged remarks in the 2007 documentary "Samosa Politics". The court case did not proceed to trial and in December 2015, the parties agreed to unconditionally end the proceedings.

The World Sikh Organization of Canada (WSO) worked with Ammerdeep Singh and the Yellow Cab taxi company to reach a mutually acceptable resolution regarding the company's dress code and his style of turban. On July 7, Mr. Singh's ID was frozen due to an alleged violation of Yellow Cab's driver dress code. The issue in question was that of Mr. Singh's choice of turban style. WSO worked with Yellow Cab to create a formal turban dress code policy for the company's Sikh drivers.

In October 2011, WSO helped Seneca College student Jaspreet Singh secure the right to freely wear his kirpan on campus, and worked with Seneca College in developing a policy document with respect to the kirpan as well as training materials for faculty, students and security.

The Human Rights Law Network (HRLN) and the World Sikh Organization of Canada (WSO) announced the inauguration of the Khalra Centre for Human Rights Defenders in New Delhi during a conference held in collaboration with other human rights groups from across India on November 19 and 20, 2011. The Centre has been established to serve as a legal resource for human rights defenders who find themselves in danger or who are attacked and also to undertake research into human rights issues. The foundation of the Centre was welcomed by the human rights defenders present and all attendees rose to pay their respects to the memory of S. Khalra.

There are WSO chapters in every major Canadian city. WSO works with other interfaith and human rights organizations to promote awareness and education about human rights issues, in addition to providing education about the Sikh faith.

== Allegations of extremism ==
A 2007 CBC report described the WSO as an organization which does not advocate violence despite calling for an independent Sikh state, however it claimed that supporters and members of the organization have praised and provided support to people who have committed violent acts. Former head of the WSO, Daljit Singh Sandhu, praised Inderjit Singh Reyat, a man convicted of making the bomb used in the Air India bombing, describing him as a "friend" and a "good man". The report further connected members of the WSO with the Sanjh Savera, a Punjabi weekly operating in Canada; multiple WSO presidents and members served on the newsletter's advisory board. In May 2007, the Sanjh Savera condemned former BC premier Ujjal Dosanjh for objecting to a Sikh parade depicting Talwinder Singh Parmar, mastermind of the Air India bombing, as a martyr. The Sanjh's editorial further seemingly praised and condoned a violent attack on Dosanjh by a Sikh militant wielding an iron bar.

The book Countering Violent Extremism and Terrorism: Assessing Domestic and International Strategies published by McGill-Queen's University Press in 2020 claimed that successful Indian efforts against terrorism led several groups to operate abroad. The book labelled the World Sikh Organization as a prominent radical Sikh group within Canada, along with the International Sikh Youth Federation and the Babbar Khalsa International, both of which are included in the Public Safety Canada's Listed Terrorist Entities.
