= 1907 Bellingham race riot =

Riots against Americans of Asian descent in Bellingham

1907 Bellingham Race Riot
- Part of Anti-Indian sentiment
- Date: September 4, 1907
- Location: Bellingham, Washington, United States
- Caused by: Racial prejudice against South Asian immigrants, labor competition in the lumber mills
- Goals: Expulsion of South Asian Indian immigrants from Bellingham
- Methods: Mob violence, beatings, intimidation
- Status: Ended by September 5, 1907
- Result: Indian immigrants expelled, no prosecution of mob members

Parties
White mob (predominantly Asiatic Exclusion League)	South Asian Indian immigrants (mostly Sikhs)

Number
400-500	125+

Casualties and losses
None	6 hospitalized (disputed)

Casualties
- Deaths: None
- Injuries: 6 hospitalized (disputed)
- Arrested: 5 arrested, all released
- Damage: None reported
- Detained: 100 held overnight in Bellingham jail
- Charged: None
- Fined: None
- Long-term racial tension: Migration of victims to other areas, lasting racial tension

The Bellingham riots occurred on September 4, 1907, in Bellingham, Washington, United States. A mob of approximately 500 white men, predominantly members of the Asiatic Exclusion League, with intentions to exclude Indian immigrants from the work force of the local lumber mills, attacked the homes of the South Asian Indians. The Indians were mostly Sikhs from Punjab but were labelled as Hindus by much of the media of the day.

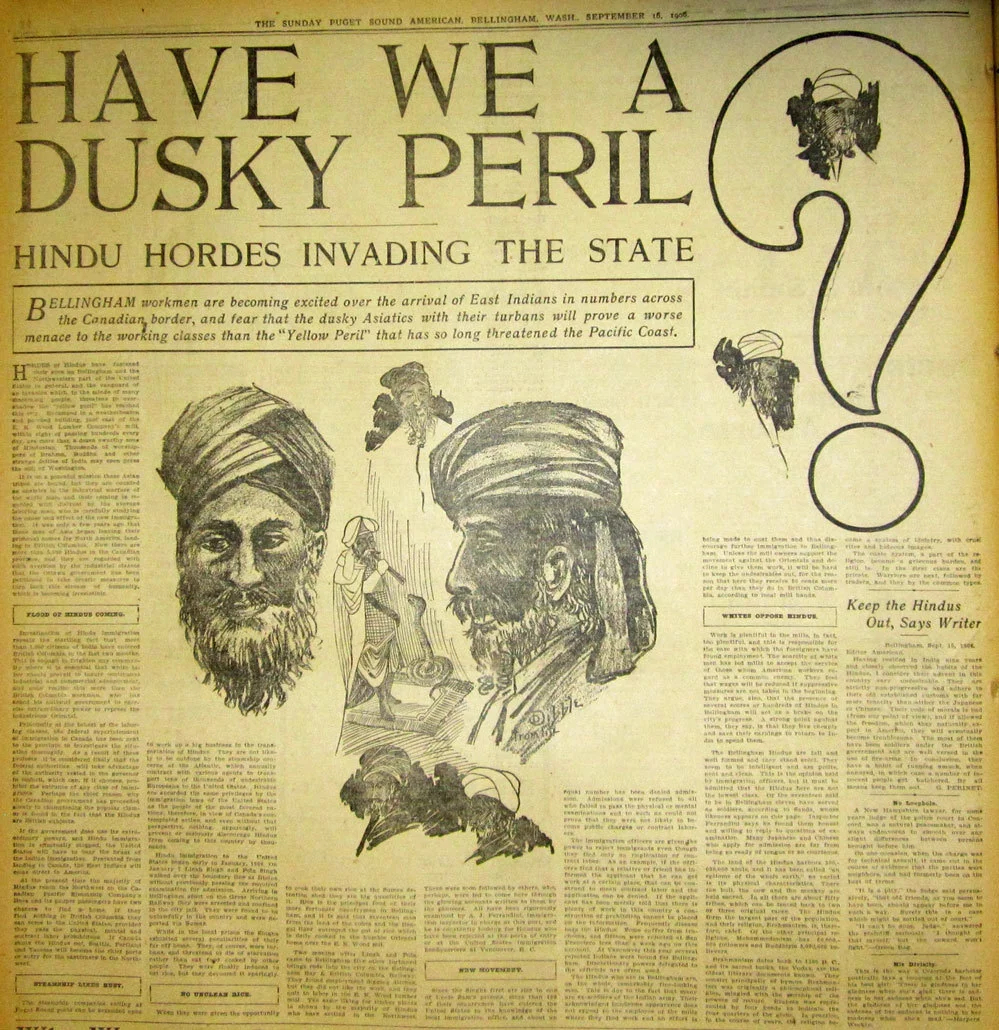
Article from the 16 September 1906 Puget Sound American newspaper incorrectly describing turbaned Sikhs as "Hindu" and their unfavorable immigration to Bellingham

== Background and Context ==
In the early 1900s, Bellingham was home to a substantial number of Asian Immigrants who came to Bellingham from places such as the Daoba Region of Punjab, in search of better job opportunities that would help to not only support their families, but to contribute to India’s growing independence movement. Bellingham was home to lumber camps and mills, fishing and the Great Northern Railway, which helped to provide prospective jobs for the immigrants.

Hundreds of Sikhs, Japanese, Koreans, Chinese and several other Asian immigrants emigrated to Bellingham and found active employment, until September 4th, 1907.

== Events ==
The mob threw the South Asian workers into the streets, beat them, and pocketed their valuables. The authorities co-operated with the mob by corralling the beaten Indian immigrants into the City Hall, ostensibly for their safety. "By the next day 125 South Asians had been driven out of town and were on their way to British Columbia". According to one report, disputed by local leaders and newspapers, six South Asians were hospitalized; no one was killed. About 100 were held overnight in the Bellingham jail, reportedly under "protective custody". Although five men were arrested, they were later released and none of the participants in the mob violence were prosecuted.

Some victims of the riots migrated to Everett, Washington where two months later, they received similar treatment. Similar riots occurred during this period in Vancouver, BC and California.

== Legacy ==
To acknowledge and atone for the riots, Whatcom County Executive Pete Kremen and Bellingham Mayor Tim Douglas jointly proclaimed the 100th anniversary of the riots, Sept. 4, 2007, a "Day of Healing and Reconciliation." A granite monument, the Arch of Healing and Reconciliation, was erected in downtown Bellingham and dedicated in 2018 in memory of the three groups of Asian immigrants who were expelled from the region: the Chinese in 1885, the Indians in 1907, and the Japanese in 1942.

== See also ==
- 1907 Vancouver anti-Asian riots – Riots against Canadians of Asian descent in Vancouver, which followed those in Bellingham
- List of incidents of civil unrest in the United States
- Pacific Coast race riots of 1907 – Race riots on the American Pacific coast in 1907
