= Tim Douglas =

American politician

Tim Douglas is the former mayor of Bellingham, Washington. Douglas moved to Bellingham in August 1967, after completing his master's degree in Indiana.

Douglas was appointed by the Bellingham City Council in September 2006 to serve the remainder of former Mayor Mark Asmundson's four-year term. He had previously served as mayor from 1984–1995. He left office when Mayor Dan Pike was elected in November 2007.

Douglas was given a lifetime community service award in May 2006.

== See also ==
- List of mayors of Bellingham, Washington
