= Anne Matthews =

College lecturer and environmental author

- Writing career
- Genre: Environmental
- Subject: Environmental Author

Anne Matthews is a college lecturer and author of articles and books with environmental and academic themes. Her book, Where the Buffalo Roam: Restoring America's Great Plains was a 1993 Pulitzer Prize finalist in nonfiction. Deep Creek, written with William Howarth under the joint pen name "Dana Hand", was selected by The Washington Post as one of the best novels of 2010. Matthews is also the author of Bright College Years: Inside the American College Today, and Wild Nights: Nature Returns to the City.

Matthews served on the Library of America editorial board for the two-volume collection Reporting World War II, and she is a contributing editor for The American Scholar. She has served on the faculties of Princeton, Columbia, and New York University, and she was the first woman to direct the Princeton Writing Program. Her various articles and reviews have appeared in The New York Times, Outside, Orion, Preservation, and The Best American Science and Nature Writing.
