= 1887 Vancouver anti-Chinese riots =

Race riots in Vancouver, Canada

The Vancouver anti-Chinese riots of 1887, sometimes called the Winter Riots because of the time of year they took place, were prompted by the engagement of cheap Chinese labour by the Canadian Pacific Railway to clear Vancouver's West End of large Douglas fir trees and stumps, passing over the thousands of unemployed men from the rest of Canada who had arrived looking for work.

== See also ==
- Chinese head tax in Canada
- Royal Commission on Chinese Immigration (1885)
- Chinese Immigration Act of 1885
- Chinese Immigration Act, 1923
- Anti-Oriental riots (Vancouver)
