= Pacific Coast race riots of 1907 =

Race riots on the American Pacific coast in 1907

The Pacific Coast race riots were a series of riots which occurred in the United States and Canada in 1907. The violent riots resulted from growing anti-Asian sentiment among White populations during the late 19th and early 20th centuries. Rioting occurred in San Francisco, Bellingham, and Vancouver. Anti-Asian rioters in Bellingham focused mainly on several-hundred Sikh workers recently emigrated from India (falsely believed to be Hindu by rioters). Chinese immigrants were attacked in Vancouver and Japanese workers were mainly targeted in San Francisco.

== Background ==
During the late 19th and early 20th centuries, the Pacific coasts of both the United States and Canada experienced waves of Asian immigration. As Asian immigrants continued emigrating to North America, Whites on the Pacific Coast grew increasingly concerned of the economic threat they believed Asian workers to pose, as well as existing anti-Asian racism. White Americans and Canadians feared that they would be outcompeted in jobs seen at the time as "white", by Asian immigrants employed as cheap labor. Some employers were accused of firing Caucasian workers and replacing them with immigrants. "By [the] 1880s more than 100,000 Chinese were employed in a wide array of occupations, ranging from work on the railroads, in agriculture, and in mining, to work as domestics, in restaurants, and in laundries". Shortly after a wave of Chinese immigration, Japanese immigrants quickly followed suit, migrating to the United States. By the late 1880s, the number of Japanese immigrants was equivalent to the number of Chinese.

Immigration trended upwards as the 19th century came to a close, as well as the Nativist political movement among White Canadians and Americans. Nativists viewed immigrants of non Anglo-Saxon descent (including Asian-Americans, Eastern Europeans and Southern Europeans) as threats to American values and society. These movements and racially charged economic concerns culminated in three violent riots on the Pacific Coast in 1907.

== Riots ==
The riots consisted primarily of three major riots, occurring in San Francisco, Bellingham, and Vancouver.

The San Francisco riot began May 20, 1907 and continued for several days. Led by Californian nativists who violently attacked Japanese immigrants with the goal of socio-economic exclusion and school segregation, these violent riots led to a series of negotiations between the governments of the United States, Canada, and Japan, which culminated with a Gentlemen's Agreement. The Japanese government agreed to not issue passports for entry into the United States to any laborers, skilled or unskilled, if they had not previously entered the United States.

Later that year, the Bellingham riot occurred on September 4, 1907. Asian immigrants to Bellingham were employed at far lower wages than White workers, adding to existing economic and racial hostilities in the community, as White workers feared that the South Asian immigrants would displace them.

Just two days later, the Vancouver riot spanned September 7–8, ultimately as a response to White concerns with the growing Asian population over the summer of 1907. The riots resulted in restrictive legislation. From 1907 to 1908, 2,623 Indian and South Asian immigrants entered Canada. The following years, from 1908 to 1909, the number fell to only 6.

== See also ==
- List of incidents of civil unrest in Canada
