= Anti-Chinese Union =

Californian union of anti-Chinese clubs

The Anti-Chinese Union was a combination of Californian clubs that came together in 1876 with the purpose to "unite, centralize and direct the anti-Chinese strength of our Country." Several United States senators, congressmen, and other prominent politicians served on the Union's list of vice presidents. Every prominent politician in California belonged to the Anti-Chinese Union. The Union originated from anti-Chinese labor organizations and clubs against Chinese immigration and labor. They vowed to "discourage and stop any further Chinese immigration" and to "compel the Chinese living in the United States to withdraw from the country."

Members of the club pledged to four things:

- the constitution of the club
- not to employ Chinese
- not to purchase goods from the employer of Chinese
- not to sustain the Chinese or the employer of Chinese

== See also ==
- Anti-Chinese sentiment in the United States

== Bibliography ==
- Sandmeyer, Elmer Clarence (1991), The Anti-Chinese Movement in California, University of Illinois Press
