= Anti-Chinese sentiment in the United States =

History of racial discrimination

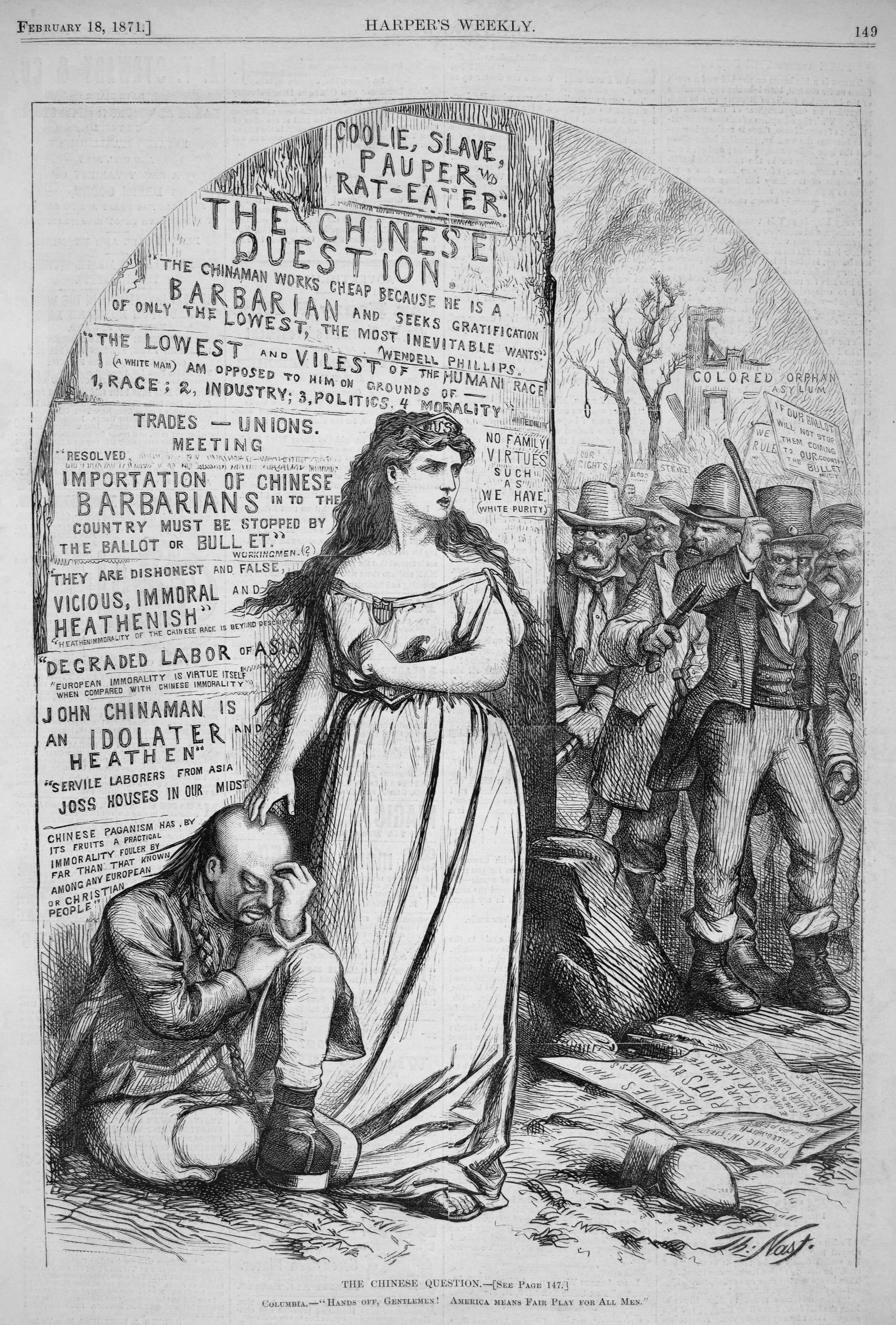
A defiant Columbia in an 1871 Thomas Nast cartoon, shown protecting a defenseless Chinese man from an angry Irish lynch mob that has just burned down an orphanage. The billboard behind is full of inflammatory anti-Chinese broadsheets.

Anti-Chinese sentiment in the United States began in the 19th century, shortly after Chinese immigrants first arrived in North America, and persists into the 21st century. This prejudice has manifested in many forms, including racist immigration policies, violence, and massacres. The first major wave of anti-Chinese violence occurred in the 1860s during the construction of world's first transcontinental railroad, driven by job competition with American workers and negative (unsubstantiated) reports from Americans who had lived in China.

Violence against Chinese in California, Oregon, Washington, and throughout the country took many forms, including pogroms; expulsions, including the destruction of a Chinatown in Denver; and massacres such as the Los Angeles Chinese massacre of 1871, the Rock Springs massacre, and the Hells Canyon massacre. Anti-Chinese sentiment led to the federal Chinese Exclusion Act of 1882, which banned the naturalization and further immigration of people of Chinese descent. Amid discussions of "Yellow Peril", anti-Chinese sentiment was eventually extended to all Asians, leading to the broader Asian Exclusion Act of 1924.

Although relations between the US and China normalized after the Sino-Soviet split and the 1972 visit by Richard Nixon to China, anti-Chinese sentiment has increased in the United States since the end of the Cold War, especially since the 2010s and in the 2020s, and its increase has been attributed to China's rise as a superpower, which is perceived as a primary threat to America's position as the world's sole superpower. In response to rising anti-Chinese violence and exclusionary legislation, Chinese immigrant communities organized politically and socially. Groups such as the Chinese Consolidated Benevolent Association submitted petitions, supported legal challenges, and published newspaper accounts that documented discrimination and contested dominant narratives portraying Chinese immigrants as passive or undesirable. Since 2019, xenophobia and racism have increased due to the COVID-19 pandemic, which was first detected in Wuhan, China. This has led to heightened discrimination and violence against Chinese individuals and those perceived to be of Chinese descent, particularly Asians. This surge in xenophobia is a continuation of the long history of anti-Chinese sentiment in the United States.

== Early Chinese immigration to the United States ==
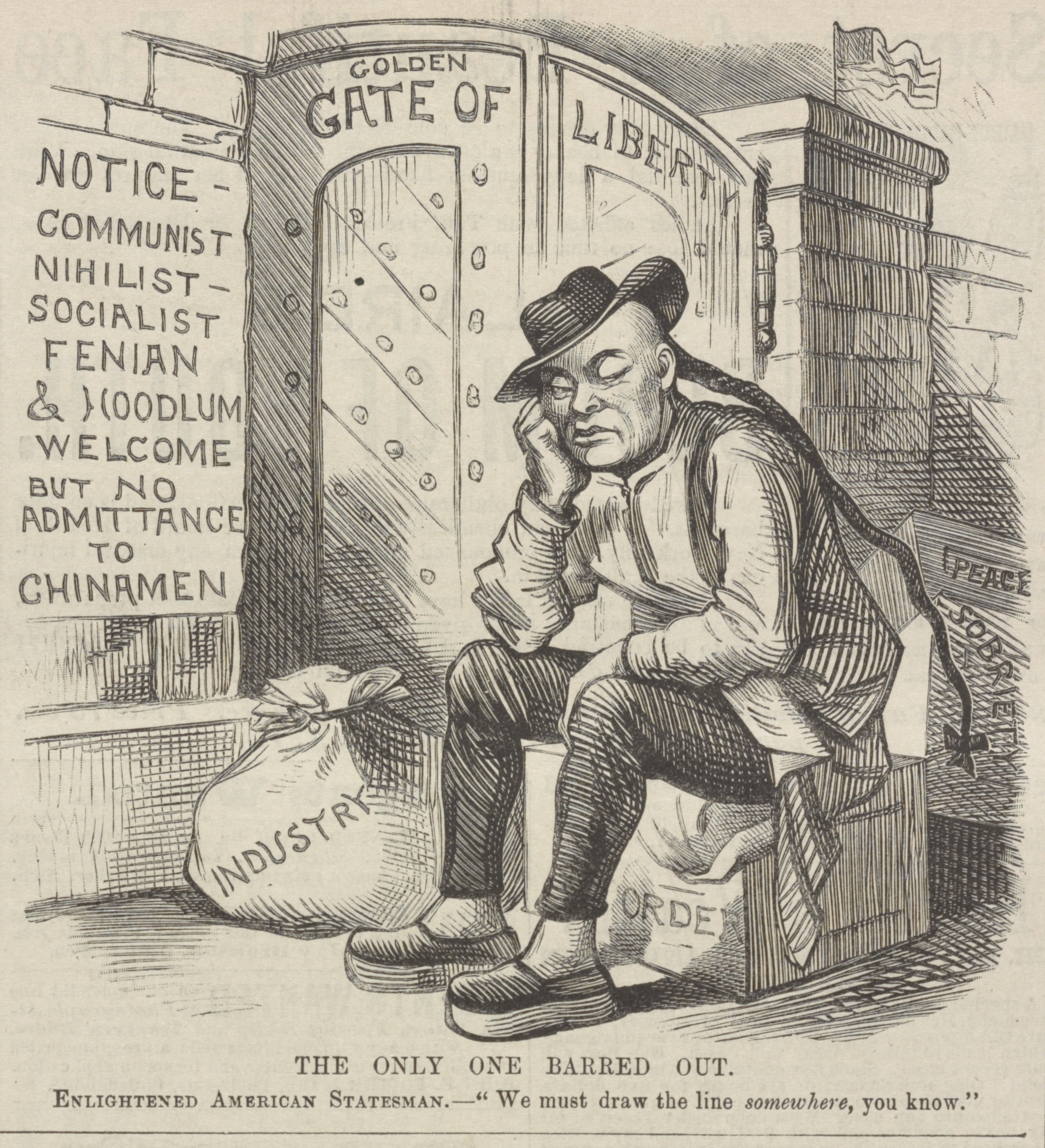
1882 editorial cartoon

The arrival of three Chinese sailors to Baltimore in 1785 marked the first record of Chinese people in the United States. During the California Gold Rush in the mid-19th century, many Chinese immigrants came to the U.S., particularly the West Coast states, where they worked as gold miners and on large labor projects, including the transcontinental railroad. Economic and social instability in China, including the decline of the Qing Dynasty, led to increased emigration, especially from Guangdong province. This migration coincided with the growth of American industry, and Chinese workers were often employed in labor-intensive jobs. Chinese people were considered by employers as "reliable" workers who would continue working, without complaint, even under destitute conditions.

In the 1850s, the stock character John Chinaman began appearing in minstrel songs. John Chinaman was caricatured as effeminate and unmanly, with many songs centering on his failed pursuit of Caucasian women.

Chinese migrant workers encountered considerable prejudice in the United States, especially by the people who occupied the lower layers in white society, and Chinese "coolies" were used as a scapegoat for depressed wage levels by politicians and labor leaders. Cases in which Chinese people were physically assaulted include the Chinese massacre of 1871 in Los Angeles and the 1982 murder of Vincent Chin in Detroit. The 1909 murder of Elsie Sigel in New York, for which a Chinese person was suspected, was blamed on the entire Chinese community and led to physical violence. "The murder of Elsie Sigel immediately grabbed the front pages of newspapers, which portrayed Chinese men as dangerous to "innocent" and "virtuous" young white women. This murder led to a surge in the harassment of Chinese in communities across the United States."

The emerging American trade unions, under such leaders as Samuel Gompers, also took an outspoken anti-Chinese position, regarding Chinese laborers as competitors to white laborers. Only with the emergence of the international trade union Industrial Workers of the World did trade unionists start to accept Chinese workers as part of the American working-class.

During this period, the phrase "yellow peril" was popularized in the U.S. by newspapers owned by William Randolph Hearst. It was also the title of a popular book by an influential U.S. religious figure, G. G. Rupert, who published The Yellow Peril; or, Orient vs. Occident in 1911. Based on the phrase "the kings from the East" in the Christian scriptural verse Revelation 16:12, Rupert made the claim that China, India, Japan and Korea were attacking the West, but that Jesus Christ would stop them. In his 1982 book The Yellow Peril: Chinese Americans in American fiction, 1850–1940, William F. Wu states that "Pulp magazines in the 30s had a lot of yellow peril characters loosely based on Fu Manchu... Most were of Chinese descent, but because of the geopolitics at the time, a growing number of people were seeing Japan as a threat, too."

Dr. Sun Yat-sen argued that the uneducated and unsophisticated behavior of many Chinese immigrants at the time left poor impressions on Americans, leading some major American hotels to exclude them.

In the western states, "Anti-Chinese Leagues" were formed in cities such as Tombstone, Arizona, San Francisco, and Santa Rosa, California. Anti-Chinese riots, expulsions and massacres broke out in several western localities: Los Angeles, CA (1871), San Francisco, CA (1877), Denver, CO (1880), Eureka, CA (1885), Rock Springs, WY (1885), Tacoma, WA (1885), Seattle, WA (1886), Chinese Massacre Cove, OR (1887).

=== Chinese Exclusion Act and legal discrimination ===
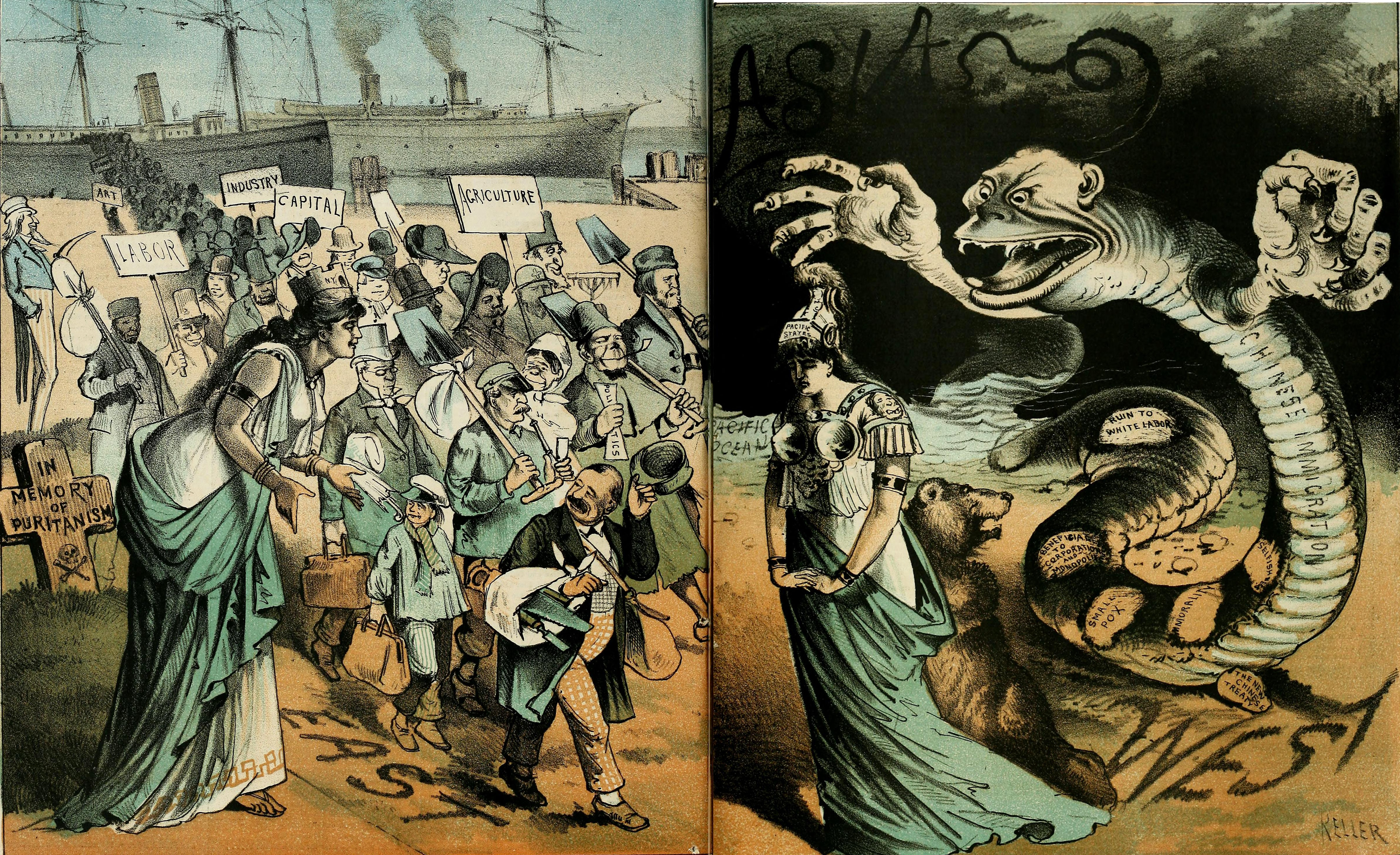
Comparison of European immigrants, represented in the left panel as virtues, while Chinese immigrants are represented by a serpent representing maladies, The Wasp (San Francisco), Vol. 7, 1881

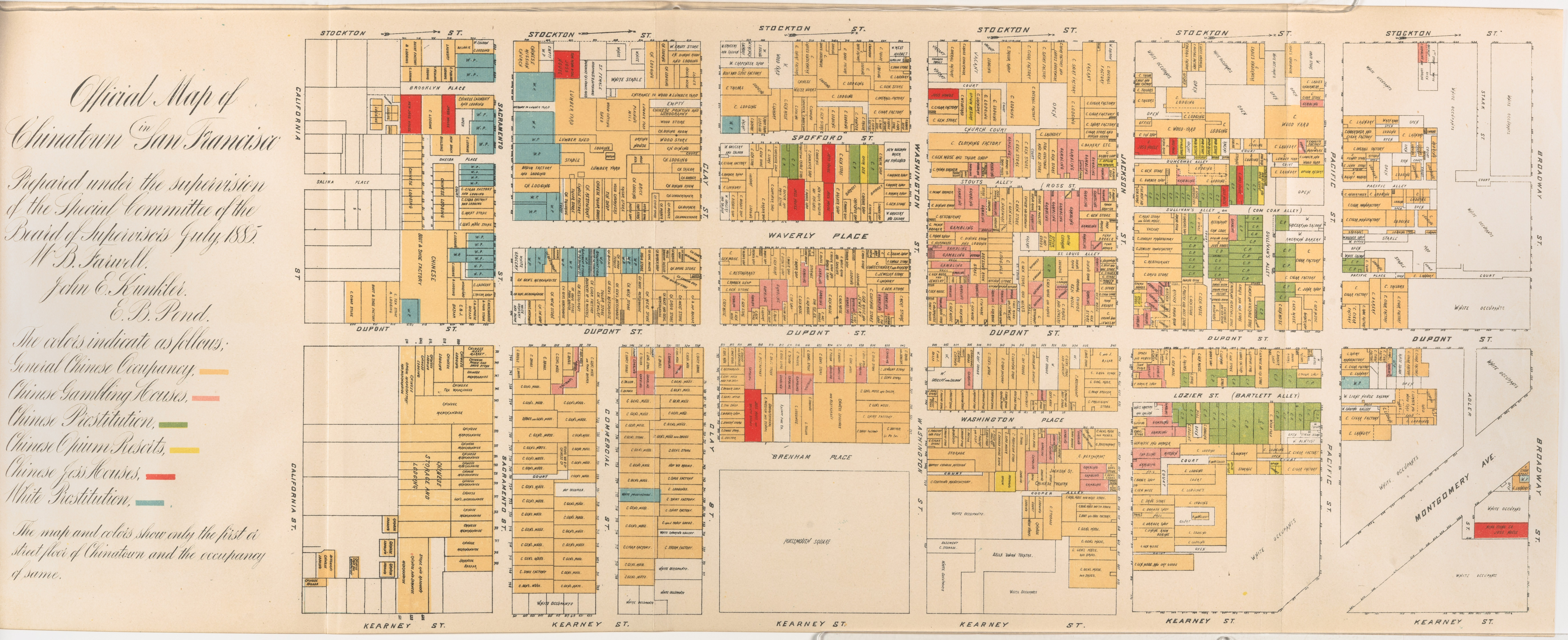
This map was published in 1885 as part of an official report of a Special Committee established by the San Francisco Board of Supervisors "on the Condition of the Chinese Quarter".

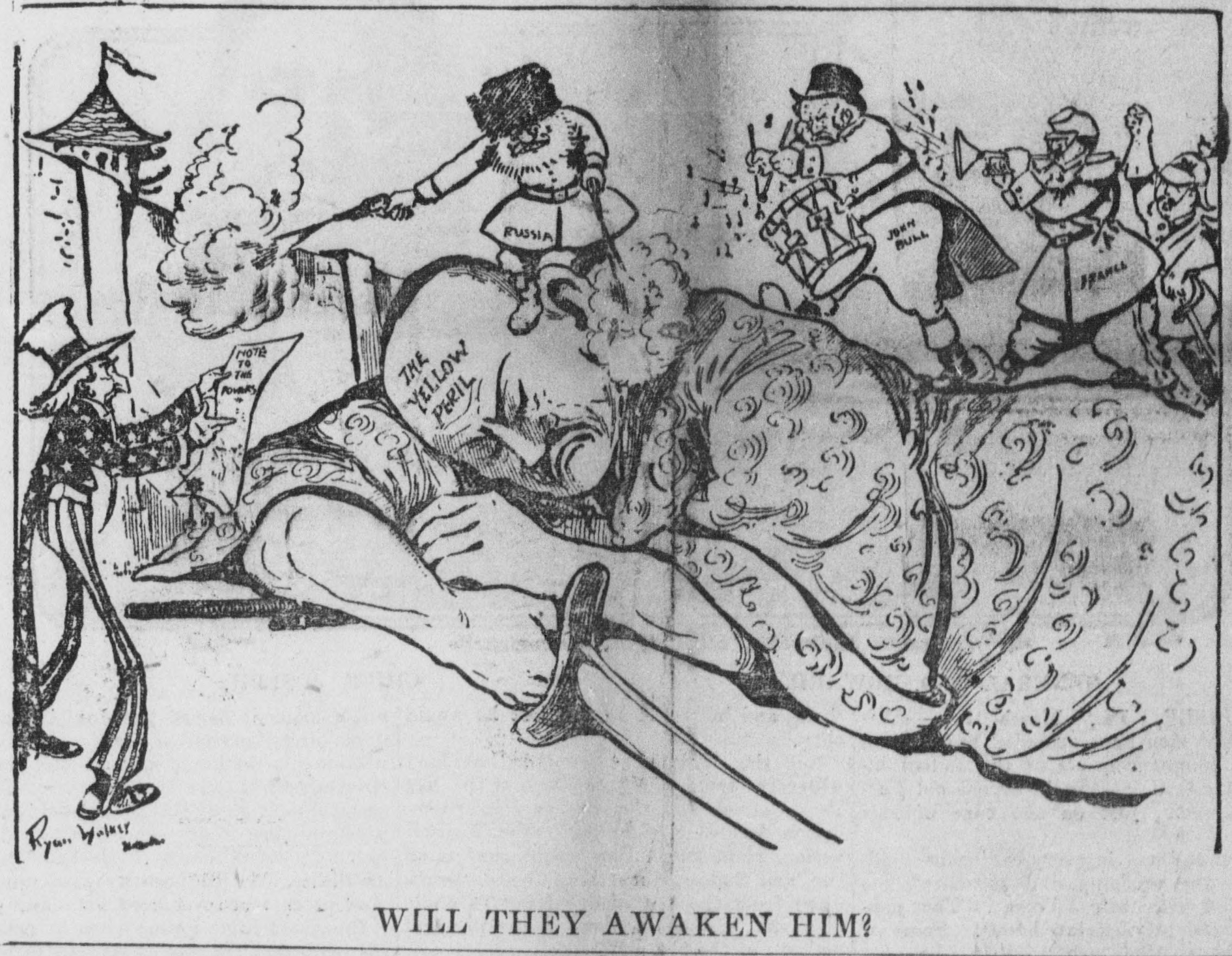
Cartoon of Uncle Sam warning the imperial powers of awakening the Yellow Peril while fighting over Asian territory, 1904

In 1862, the Anti-Coolie Act specifically taxed Chinese immigrants at rates over half their income to suppress their jobs and economic participation per yellow peril tropes popular at that time.

In the 1870s and 1880s, various legal discriminatory measures were taken against Chinese people. A notable example is that after San Francisco segregated its Chinese school children from 1859 until 1870, the law was amended in 1870 so the requirement to educate Chinese children could be dropped entirely. The amendment of the law led to Tape v. Hurley, 66 Cal. 473 (1885), a landmark court case in the California Supreme Court in which the Court ruled that the exclusion of a Chinese American student, Mary Tape, from public school based on her ancestry was unlawful. However, the legislation was passed at the urging of the San Francisco Superintendent of Schools Andrew J. Moulder after the school board lost its case and a segregated school was established.

Another key piece of legislation was the Naturalization Act of 1870, which extended citizenship rights to African Americans but barred Chinese from naturalization on the grounds that they and other Asians could not be assimilated into American society. Unable to become citizens, Chinese immigrants were prohibited from voting and serving on juries, and dozens of states passed alien land laws that prohibited non-citizens from purchasing real estate, thus preventing them from establishing permanent homes and businesses. The idea of an "unassimilable" race became a common argument in the exclusionary movement against Chinese Americans. In particular, even in his lone dissent against Plessy v. Ferguson (1896), then-Supreme Court Justice John Marshall Harlan wrote of Chinese people as: "a race so different from our own that we do not permit those belonging to it to become citizens of the United States. Persons belonging to it are, with few exceptions, absolutely excluded from our country. I allude to the Chinese race."

In 1873, the Pigtail Ordinance targeted Qing dynasty immigrants' largely mandatory queue hairstyle which intended to reduce Qing immigration by banning their hairstyle which they must have to enable customary later re-entry to China. The city board passed it but the mayor vetoed it. The city council enacted it in 1876 but was struck down as unconstitutional in 1879.

In the US, xenophobic fear of the alleged "Yellow Peril" led to the implementation of the Page Act of 1875 which excluded Chinese women from entering the US per yellow peril and dragon lady stereotypes, the 1882 Chinese Exclusion Act, expanded ten years later by the Geary Act which required Chinese to register and secure a certificate as proof of entry at risk of deportation or hard labor, removed Chinese as witnesses in court proceedings, and removed Chinese as recipients of habeas corpus in legal proceedings. The Immigration Act of 1917 then created an "Asian Barred Zone" under nativist influence.

The 1879 Constitution of the State of California prohibited the employment of Chinese people by state and local governments, as well as by businesses which were incorporated in California. Also, it delegated the power to remove Chinese people to the local governments of California.

In 1880, the elected officials of the city of San Francisco passed an ordinance which made it illegal to operate a laundry in a wooden building without a permit from the Board of Supervisors. The ordinance delegated the power to grant or withhold the permits upon the Board of Supervisors. At the time, about 95% of the city's 320 laundries were operated in wooden buildings. Approximately two-thirds of those laundries were owned by Chinese people. Although most of the city's wooden building laundry owners applied for a permit, only one permit was granted of the two hundred applications from any Chinese owner, while virtually all non-Chinese applicants were granted a permit. However, this led to the 1886 Supreme Court case Yick Wo v. Hopkins, that was the first case where the Supreme Court ruled that a law that is race-neutral on its face, but is administered in a prejudicial manner, is an infringement of the Equal Protection Clause in the Fourteenth Amendment to the U.S. Constitution.

Discriminatory laws, in particular the Chinese Exclusion Act of 1882, were aimed at restricting further immigration from China. It was the first law to racially exclude persons and leave them intentionally unprotected by law. The Chinese Exclusion Act of 1882 was repealed by the Chinese Exclusion Repeal Act of 1943. The Chinese Exclusion Act allowed limited college students entry into the US; however, it became increasingly difficult for such immigrants to gain access. By 1900, laws restricted Chinese students from entering the country unless they came from a wealthy family, they sought studies in programs not offered in China, and required a return to China after completing their studies. Heavy discrimination against Chinese students made it difficult for the US to expand international education opportunities in China and limited the ability of US colleges and universities from improving the reputation of their institutions.

In the USA xenophobic fears against the alleged "Yellow Peril" led to the implementation of the Page Act of 1875 which excluded Chinese women from entering the US per yellow peril and dragon lady stereotypes, the 1882 Chinese Exclusion Act, expanded ten years later by the Geary Act. The Immigration Act of 1917 then created an "Asian Barred Zone" under nativist influence. It eliminated all immigration from all of geographical Asia. The Chinese Exclusion Act was one of the most significant restrictions on free immigration in U.S. history. The Act excluded Chinese "skilled and unskilled laborers and Chinese employed in mining" from entering the country for ten years under penalty of imprisonment and deportation. Many Chinese were relentlessly beaten just because of their race. The few Chinese non-laborers who wished to immigrate had to obtain certification from the Chinese government that they were qualified to immigrate, which tended to be difficult to prove.

The 1921 Emergency Quota Act then the Immigration Act of 1924 restricted immigration according to national origins. While the Emergency Quota Act used the census of 1910, xenophobic fears in the WASP community lead to the adoption of the 1890 census, more favorable to White Anglo-Saxon Protestant (WASP) population, for the uses of the Immigration Act of 1924, which responded to rising immigration from Southern and Eastern Europe, as well as Asia.

In 1922, the Cable Act added the forfeiture of an American woman's citizenship if she lived abroad with a foreigner spouse, racially excluded Americans from naturalizing if married to a foreign husband, required women living in the United States to retain their citizenship in other words to not marry foreigners, and ensured no procedures for Americans living abroad who had lost one's citizenship prior to 1922 to repatriate back to the US. Its 1930 amendments later removed these anti-immigrant clauses.

In 1927, the Supreme Court held in Lum v. Rice that Mississippi could require a Chinese child to attend the local school for Black students since she was not white under that state's law. The unanimous opinion by Chief Justice, and former president, William Howard Taft held that racial segregation in public education did not violate the Fourteenth Amendment, allowing such discrimination to become much more widespread until the later Brown v. Board of Education decision held it all unconstitutional.

In 1929, the National Origins Formula explicitly kept the status quo distribution of ethnicity by allocating quotas in proportion to the actual population. The idea was that immigration would not be allowed to change the "national character". Total annual immigration was capped at 150,000. Asians were excluded but residents of nations in the Americas were not restricted, thus making official the racial discrimination in immigration laws. This system was repealed with the Immigration and Nationality Act of 1965.

In 1943, the Chinese Exclusion Repeal Act allowed 105 Chinese immigrants annually, itself an extension of the Immigration Act of 1924 and further intentionally miscalculated downward and explicitly continued bans against Chinese immigrants' property-ownership rights both by law or de facto until the Immigration and Nationality Act of 1965 repealed such.

=== Chinese labor and the Chinese Exclusion Act of 1882 ===
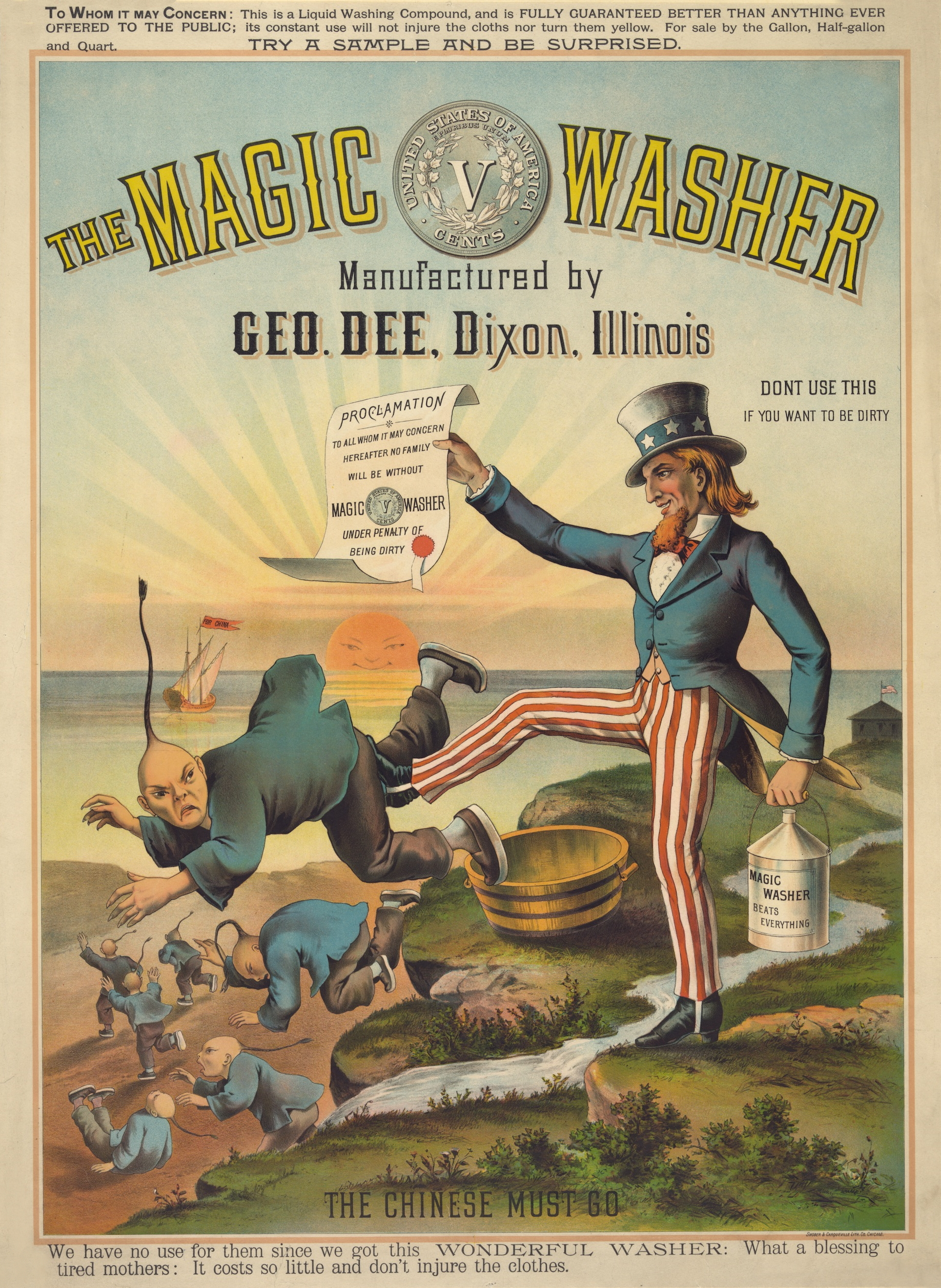
An 1886 advertisement for "Magic Washer" detergent: The Chinese Must Go. At the time most Americans patronized local Chinese owned laundries instead of a machine.

According to statistics, between 1820 and 1840, only 11 Chinese people emigrated to the United States. However, many Chinese were living in distress due to the end of the Qing Dynasty. The United States offered a more stable life, thanks to the gold rush in California, the construction of railways, and the resulting large demand for labor. Beginning in 1848, many Chinese chose to immigrate to the US. California Governor John McDougal in 1851 praised Chinese people as "the most valuable immigrants" to California.

To recruit more laborers, the United States and China signed the Burlingame Treaty in 1868. The Burlingame Treaty provided several rights, including that Chinese people can freely enter and leave the United States; the right of abode in the United States; and the United States most-favored treatment of Chinese nationals in the United States. The Treaty stimulated immigration for the 20 years between 1853 and 1873 and resulted in the immigration of nearly 105,000 Chinese to the United States by 1880.

1882 was an election year in California. To secure more votes, California politicians adopted a staunch anti-China stance. In Congress, California Republican Senator John Miller spoke at length in support of a bill to prohibit further Chinese immigrants, substantially the same as one from the prior session of Congress that had been vetoed by Republican President Rutherford B. Hayes. Senator Miller submitted a motion to ban the immigration Chinese laborers for 20 years, citing the passage of the 1879 anti-Chinese referendums in California and Nevada by huge margins as proof of popular support. The motion was discussed in the Senate over the next eight days. All the Senators from western states and most of the southern Democratic Party supported Miller's proposal, strenuously objected to the eastern states senator. After intense debate, the motion eventually passed the Senate by a vote of 29 of 15; it would go on to pass in the House of Representatives on March 23, by 167 votes to 66 votes (55 abstentions).

President Chester A. Arthur vetoed the bill on April 4, 1882, as it violated the provisions of the Angell Treaty, which restricted but did not ban immigration from China. Congress was unable to overturn the veto and passed a version of the bill that banned immigration for ten years in lieu of the original twenty-year ban. On May 6, 1882, Miller's proposal was signed by President Arthur and became the Chinese Exclusion Act of 1882. It was the first United States immigration law to target a specific nationality or ethnicity.

Amendments introduced during the debate over the bill prohibited the naturalization of Chinese immigrants. After the initial ten-year ban in the Chinese Exclusion Act ended, Chinese exclusion was extended in 1892 by the Geary Act and then made permanent in 1902.

The Russo-Japanese War of 1904–05 shifted Americans' fears of the Yellow Peril from China to Japan.

== War with China in Korea ==
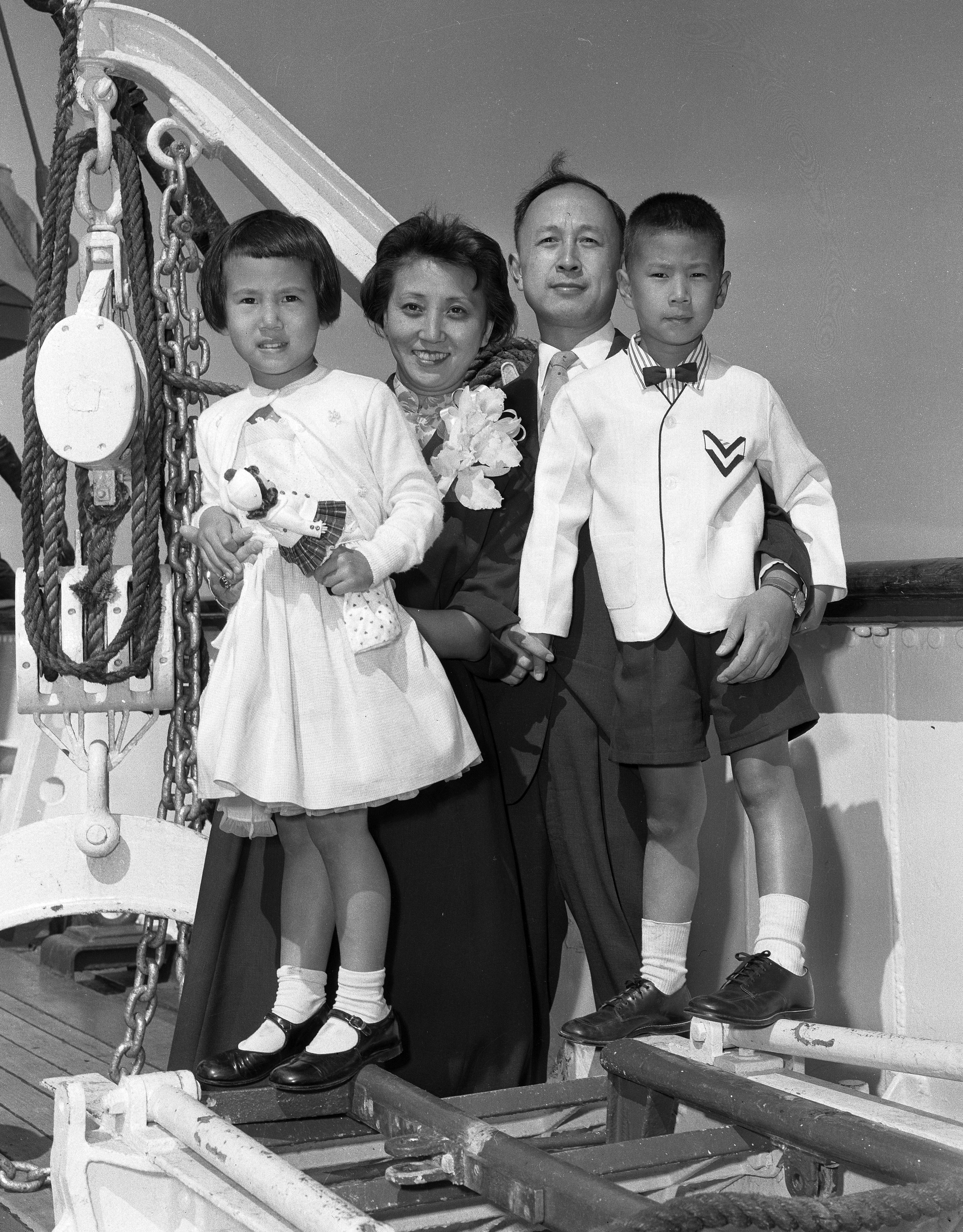
Qian and his family aboard SS President Cleveland before its departure from Los Angeles, 1955. He never returned to the US.

The United States and China fought a bloody but undeclared Korean War in 1950–1953. Over 36,000 American soldiers were killed, most of them in fighting the Chinese inside Korea. Anti-Chinese sentiment escalated, with increased popular fear of communist espionage because of the Chinese Civil War and China's involvement in the Korean War. During the era, suspected Communists were imprisoned by the hundreds, and some ten or twelve thousands of them lost their jobs. Many of those who were imprisoned, lost their jobs or were questioned by committees, had a real past or present connection of some kind with the Communist Party. However, for the vast majority of them, their potential to do harm to the nation and the nature of their communist affiliations were both tenuous. Among these victims were Chinese Americans, who are often viewed with suspicion of being affiliated with the CCP.

=== Deportation of Qian Xuesen ===
The most notable example is that of the top Chinese scientist Qian Xuesen. Allegations were made that he was a communist, and his security clearance was revoked in June 1950. The Federal Bureau of Investigation located an American Communist Party document from 1938 with his name on it and used it as justification for the revocation. Without his clearance, Qian found himself unable to pursue his career, and within two weeks, he announced plans to return to mainland China, which had come under the government of Mao Zedong. The Undersecretary of the Navy at the time, Dan A. Kimball, tried to keep Qian in the US:

It was the stupidest thing this country ever did. He was no more a Communist than I was, and we forced him to go.

Qian would spend the next five years under house arrest, which included constant surveillance with the permission to teach without any research (classified) duties. Caltech appointed attorney Grant Cooper to defend Qian. In 1955, the United States deported him to China in exchange for five American pilots captured during the Korean War. Later, he became the father of the modern Chinese space program.

== 21st century Anti-Chinese sentiment and presidential campaigns ==
Modern anti-Chinese sentiment in the United States may stem from concerns about China's growing geopolitical influence. The 'rise of China' has been named the top news story of the 21st century by the Global Language Monitor, based on its prevalence in global media and social platforms.

During the United States 2010 elections, both major political parties ran numerous negative advertisements focusing on candidates' alleged support for free trade with China. Some stock images accompanying ominous voiceovers about China were actually of Chinatown, San Francisco. An advertisement called "Chinese Professor," depicting a 2030 conquest of the West by China, used local Asian American extras to portray Chinese roles without informing the actors of the nature of the shoot. Columnist Jeff Yang noted a "blurry line between Chinese and Chinese-Americans" in the campaign. Larry McCarthy, the producer of "Chinese Professor," defended the ad by stating, "this ad is about America, it's not about China." Other editorials have stated that the video is not anti-Chinese.

=== Wolf Amendment ===
As component of the Wolf Amendment, many American space researchers were prohibited from working with Chinese citizens affiliated with a Chinese state enterprise or entity. In April 2011, the 112th United States Congress banned NASA from using its funds to host Chinese visitors at NASA facilities because of espionage concerns. Earlier in 2010, US Representative John Culberson, had urged President Barack Obama not to allow further contact between NASA and the China National Space Administration (CNSA).

=== Donald Trump's campaign and presidency ===
==== 2016 presidential campaign ====
In November 2015, Donald Trump promised to designate China as a currency manipulator on his first day in office. He pledged "swift, robust and unequivocal" action against Chinese piracy, counterfeit American goods, and the theft of American trade secrets and intellectual property. He also condemned China's "illegal export subsidies and lax labor and environmental standards."

In January 2016, Trump proposed a 45% tariff on Chinese exports to the United States to give "American workers a level playing field." When asked about potential Chinese retaliation to the implementation of tariffs, such as sales of US bonds, Trump judged such a scenario to be unlikely: "They won't crash our currency. They will crash their economy. That's what they are going to do if they start playing that." In a May 2016 speech, Trump responded to concerns regarding a potential trade war with China: "We're losing $500 billion in trade with China. Who the hell cares if there's a trade war?" Trump also said in May 2016 that China is "raping" the U.S. with free trade.

==== First presidency (2017–21) ====
In January 2018, Trump launched a trade war with China and he also began to impose new visa restrictions on foreign students and visiting scholars of Chinese nationality; many affected said that they experienced delays in renewing their visas or even outright cancellations of their visas. In 2018, Presidential Advisor Stephen Miller proposed banning all Chinese nationals from obtaining visas to study in the United States.

According to the results of a Gallup poll which were published in February 2019, China was considered the greatest enemy of the United States by 21% percent of American respondents, only second to Russia.

In April 2019, FBI Director Christopher Wray said that China posed a "whole of a society threat". In May 2019, Director of Policy Planning Kiron Skinner said that China "is the first great power competitor of the US that is not Caucasian."

The current deterioration of relations has led to a spike in anti-Chinese sentiment in the US. According to a Pew Research Center poll released in August 2019, 60 percent of Americans have negative opinions about China, with only 26 percent holding positive views. The same poll found that China was named as America's greatest enemy by 24 percent of respondents in US, tied along with Russia.

In March 2020, Trump referred to the COVID-19 outbreak in the United States as the "Chinese Virus", despite the fact that in February 2020, the World Health Organization strongly advised the public not to racially profile the SARS‑CoV‑2 coronavirus as the "Chinese virus" or the "Wuhan virus". Additionally, the racist terms "Wuflu" and "Kung Flu" emerged in the United States during this period as pejorative and xenophobic ways of referring to COVID-19. These terms are linked to Wuhan, where the virus was first detected, or China in general, via portmanteau with terms from traditional Chinese Martial Arts, Wushu and Kung Fu, and have been used by President Trump and members of his administration in an official capacity. Use of these terms has drawn widespread criticism for their perceived racial insensitivity.

In May 2020, a West Virginia-raised Chinese-American CBS reporter, Weijia Jiang, questioned Trump at a White House coronavirus briefing about his stance on testing and he told her to question China. The reporter responded to Trump by asking him why he singled her out by stating that she should question China, which led to an abrupt end to the briefing.

In December 2020, Tennessee Senator Marsha Blackburn tweeted that "China has a 5,000 year history of cheating and stealing. Some things will never change...", resulting in a backlash by Chinese-American civil rights activists, arguing that her tweet insulted people of Chinese descent.

=== COVID-19 pandemic ===
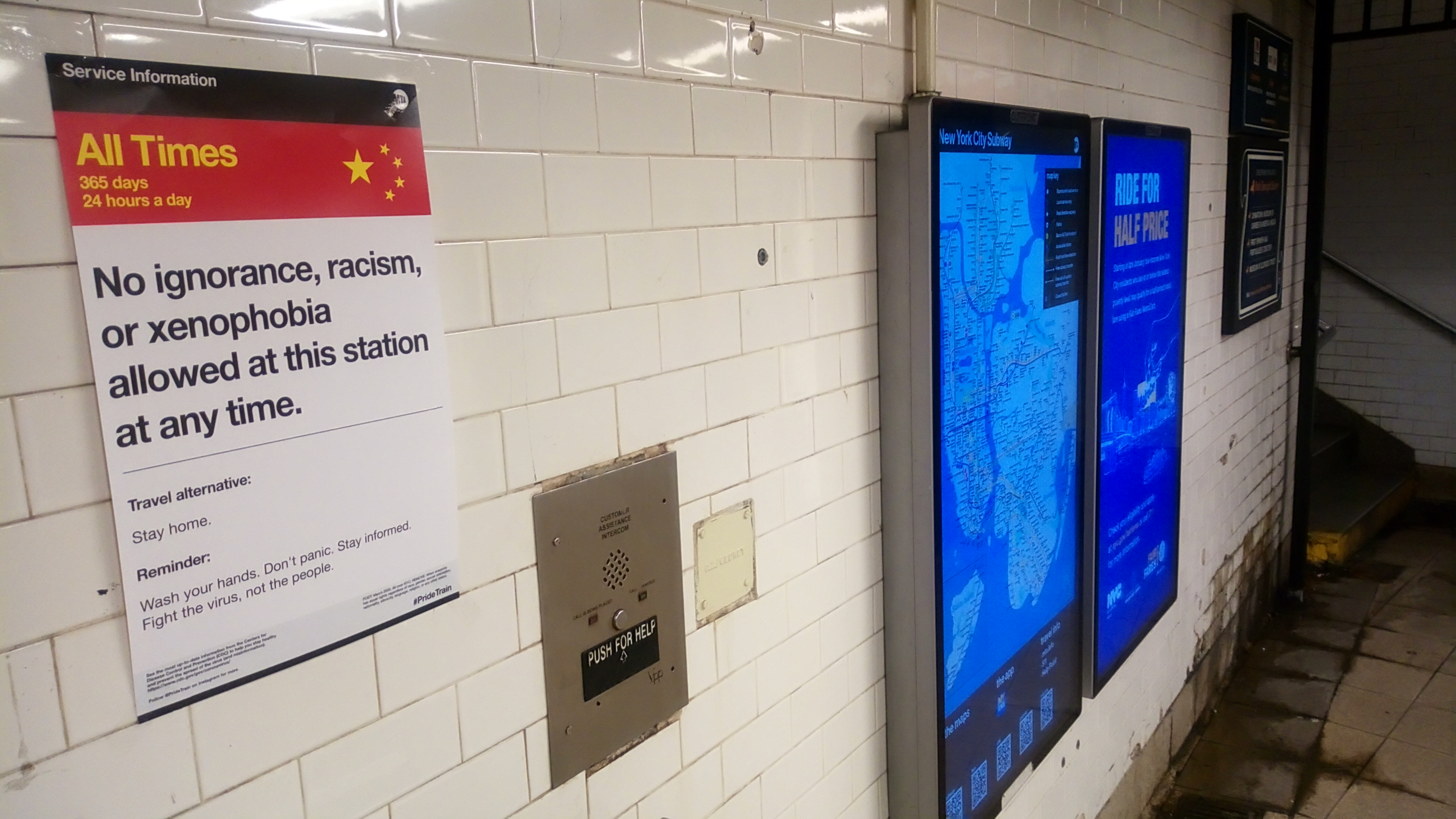
An unofficial anti-xenophobia poster at a New York City Subway station amidst the COVID-19 pandemic

The COVID-19 pandemic was first reported in the city of Wuhan, Hubei, China, in December 2019, and as a result, acts and displays of Sinophobia, have increasingly occurred, as well as incidents of prejudice, xenophobia, discrimination, violence, and racism against people of East Asian ancestry. According to a June 2020 Pew Research study, 58% of Asian Americans believe that racist views of them had increased since the pandemic. A study by the New York University College of Arts & Science found that there was no overall increase of Anti-Asian sentiment among the American population, instead it suggested that "already prejudiced persons" had felt authorized by the pandemic to act openly on their prejudices.

=== Joe Biden's Presidency ===
Since the start of the Biden Presidency on January 20, 2021, President Joe Biden has described tensions with China as a competition between democracy and autocracy. Studies suggest that framing the relationship between the United States and China as a great power competition foments anti-Asian sentiment among White Americans. According to an analysis conducted by Vladimir Enrique and Medenica David Ebner at Asia Times in June 2021, White Americans are more likely to support war with China if such a military confrontation between the two countries ever materializes. White Americans described as "racially resentful" were 36 percentage points more likely than other White Americans to perceive China posing as a major geopolitical threat back in 2012 and 20 percentage points more likely compared in 2016.

According to a poll done by Pew Research Center in February 2021, 55% of Americans support limiting Chinese students studying in the United States, while 43% oppose such restrictions. An open-ended poll done by Pew Research Center in May–June 2023, 50% of Americans consider China to be the greatest threat to the U.S.

A report which was published by Stop AAPI Hate listed 43% of AAPI (Asian American and Pacific Islanders) individuals reporting incidents from 2020 to 2022 to be ethnically Chinese. A survey in 2021 found that 49% of AAPIs felt safe going out, 65% felt worried about the safety of family members and elders, 32% of parents were concerned their child would be a victim of anti-AAPI discrimination at school, 95% of Asian Americans who reported a hate incident to Stop AAPI Hate viewed the U.S. as dangerous to them, 98% of Asian elders who experienced hate incidents believed the U.S. has become more physically dangerous for Asians, 49% reported anxiety or depression, and 72% named hate against them as their greatest source of stress.

A national survey estimated that at least three million AAPIs experienced hate incidents between March 2021 and March 2022. According to Stop AAPI Hate, 20% of reported hate incidents involve scapegoating, 96% of scapegoating incidents blame Asians and Asian Americans for the COVID-19 epidemic, 4% for national security reasons such as spying for the Chinese Communist Party, and 1% for being economic threats. Stop AAPI Hate notes that both Democrats and Republicans use "rhetoric that paints China as an economic threat to America's existence", mirroring language used in scapegoating East Asians and Asian Americans at large.

A report conducted by Tobita Chow in 2021 used a table to show parallels between the "China threat" narratives and sentiments expressed in anti-Asian incidents such as "China is cheating the US" and "You are a liar, a cheater", or "China is an espionage or influence threat" and "You are a spy, you are CCP". According to Chow, believers of American exceptionalism who perceive American global domination to be at risk of being replaced by a rising and more geopolitically assertive China, exacerbated by global economic problems and weak economic growth, contribute to a sense of anxiety that fosters zero-sum competition between countries. In discussions about China, the two claims that China is a threat to American hegemony and that it is an existential threat to the US and Americans are often used interchangeably regardless of the difference in their plausibility. Chow says that a deep commitment to American exceptionalism can make these two claims identical to each other. Anti-China messaging has been used to build bipartisan support for a number of economic policies that promote investment in infrastructure, research, technology, and job creation as necessary to counter China. Some special interest groups such as the military industrial complex stand to materially benefit from the "China threat" narratives and promote them for that reason. Chow says that "narratives about China can shape popular perceptions of Chinese people" and that the opposite is also true, where narratives of Chinese people also justify perceptions of China.

A research article submitted in September 2022 and published in Proceedings of the National Academy of Sciences of the United States of America in June 2023 states that scholars of Chinese descent feel significant unease in the US: 83% received insults in a non-professional setting in the last year, 72% feel unsafe as a researcher, 35% feel unwelcome in the US, and 61% have considered leaving the US.

According to survey results released on April 27, 2023, nearly 75% of Chinese Americans have experienced racism in the past twelve months. The survey, conducted by Columbia University and the Committee of 100 with 6,500 respondents, found that 7% reported property destruction, 9% experienced physical assault or intimidation, 20% faced verbal or online harassment, and 46% encountered unequal treatment.

On April 27, 2023, Columbia University and the Committee of 100 announced the results of a survey on Chinese Americans. According to the survey results based on the answers of 6,500 participants across the US, 74% of Chinese Americans have experienced racism in the past twelve months. One in five reported verbal or online harassment several times in the past twelve months. Nearly half the respondents (46%) reported unequal treatment compared to others. Almost one in ten (9%) reported physical assault or intimidation while 7% reported destruction of property.

According to the 2023 STAATUS Index survey, nearly half of Americans believe that negative views of China have contributed to anti-Asian attacks or incidents. Among the reasons for anti-Asian hate, 33% of respondents believe that viewing China as an economic threat is a contributing factor while 47% believe that viewing China as an espionage threat is a contributing factor.

=== Foreign purchase of or acquisition of title to real property ===
A Texas Senate bill tabled in 2023 by state representatives of the Republican Party, known as SB 147, was met with intense backlash particularly by Asian American groups. The bill would prohibit "certain aliens or foreign entities" from acquiring real property in the state of Texas, including those with affiliations or origins from China. The bill has also found support from Governor of Texas Greg Abbott. Critics have compared the bill to the racist Chinese Exclusion Act and called it unconstitutional. Others also added that it may lead to a negative snowball effect for further racist legislation, particularly targeting Chinese people and East Asians in general.

Sylvester Turner, Mayor of Houston, referred to the bill as "just down right wrong" and that "it is more divisive than anything else". State representative Gene Wu added that "this type of legislation. This growing anti-Asian and anti-immigrant sentiment is a direct attack on our community and on our city, quite frankly." The legislation does not give any exceptions to asylum seekers, lawful permanent residents, valid visa holders or dual citizens (the bill also covered people from North Korea, Iran and Russia). Further protests in the streets of Houston against the bill were held by Asian American groups and allies in February 2023.

Virginia's state Senate, which is controlled by Democrats, also recently passed a ban on land ownership by "foreign adversaries." In all, at least 18 states have considered limiting the ownership of farmland by entities linked to China, according to the National Agricultural Law Center.

On May 8, 2023, Florida governor Ron DeSantis signed bills SB 264 and HB 1355 banning Chinese citizens from buying land in the state. Critics have warned that the bills could contribute to discrimination against the Chinese and other immigrants. Democratic state Rep. Anna V. Eskamani voiced concerns about the impact on Asian Americans. Asian American organizations compared the bills to the Alien land laws and the Chinese Exclusion Act.

== Accusations of spying ==
Under the first Trump administration, the Justice Department launched the China Initiative to target supposed spies of the People's Republic of China. In 2018, Donald Trump's FBI Director Christopher A. Wray publicly called students and researchers of Chinese descent potential spies and said that the FBI views China "not just a whole-of-government threat but a whole-of-society threat" requiring a "whole-of-society response".

The American Civil Liberties Union said the initiative cast broad, unjustified suspicion on Chinese American scientists and unfairly targeted them for investigation and prosecution. Several of the resulting prosecutions have been based on faulty grounds; they have resulted in devastating consequences for the lives of those affected.

The Biden administration continued the initiative, despite civil-rights organizations' calls to end it. The Asian Americans Advancing Justice expressed "deep concern with the federal government's racial, ethnic, and national origin profiling and discriminatory investigations and prosecutions of Asian Americans and Asian immigrants". A 2021 survey of almost 2,000 scientists in the United States showed that more than half of scientists of Chinese descent, regardless of citizenship, feared surveillance from the US government.

The Justice Department ended the initiative on February 22, 2022, citing perceptions of unfair treatment of Chinese Americans and residents of Chinese origin.

=== Xi Xiaoxing ===
In 2015, police raided the home of Temple University physics professor Xi Xiaoxing and arrested him at gunpoint in front of his wife and two daughters. The Justice Department (DOJ) accused the scientist of illegally sending trade secrets to China—the design of a pocket heater used in superconductor research—and threatened him with 80 years in prison and $1 million in fines. The scientist's daughter Joyce Xi said, "Newscasters surrounded our home and tried to film through windows. The FBI rummaged through all our belongings and carried off electronics and documents containing many private details of our lives. For months, we lived in fear of FBI intimidation and surveillance. We worried about our safety in public, given that my dad's face was plastered all over the news. My dad was unable to work, and his reputation was shattered."

Temple University forced the professor to take administrative leave and suspended him as chair of the Physics Department. He was also banned from accessing his lab or communicating with his students directly. It was later learned that FBI agents had been listening to his phone calls and reading his emails for months – possibly years.

In 2015, DOJ abruptly dropped the charges after investigators found that the information Xi shared did not include trade secrets.

In 2021, Xi was denied recourse after a Philadelphia court rejected his legal claims for damages.

=== Hu Anming ===
In February 2020, University of Tennessee Professor Hu Anming was indicted under the China Initiative. He was one of several Chinese-born researchers arrested and accused of failing to disclose their ties with China under the China Initiative.

During Hu's trial in June 2021, an FBI agent admitted to falsely accusing the professor of being a Chinese spy, using baseless information to place him on the federal no-fly list and spying on him and his son for two years. The FBI agent, Kujtim Sadiku, also admitted to using the false information to press Hu to become a spy for the United States government. No evidence was ever discovered that suggested Hu, who is an internationally recognized welding technology expert, had ever spied for China. The defense lawyer argued that Hu was targeted by federal agents determined to find Chinese spies where there were none, and when agents failed to secure an espionage charge, they turned instead to a charge of fraud. The case was declared a mistrial, raising concerns over whether the Justice Department was over-reaching in its investigation of suspected spies.

=== Tang Juan ===
In September 2020, Chinese cancer researcher Tang Juan was arrested and jailed by U.S. authorities, who accused her of concealing ties to the Chinese military. Tang was denied bail and later placed under house arrest. In 2021, she was released after spending 10 months in jail and house arrest without her case ever making it to trial.

Later, it was revealed that she was not a member of the Chinese military but had only worked as a civilian at a Chinese military facility.

=== Baimadajie Angwang ===
Baimadajie Angwang, a police officer for the New York City Police Department (NYPD), was arrested in September 2020 on federal charges of allegedly spying for China. The former Marine subsequently spent six months in a federal detention center before he was freed on bail while awaiting trial. Abruptly, federal prosecutors would drop the charges against him in January 2021 without further explanation. He was never compensated for his detention and lost his job as a police officer.

== See also ==
- Anti-American sentiment in China
- Anti-communism in the United States
- Anti-Japanese sentiment in the United States
- Anti-Korean sentiment in the United States
- China–United States relations
  - History of China–United States relations
  - Taiwan–United States relations
  - China–United States trade war, since 2018
- Chinese Americans
  - History of Chinese Americans
- Chinese espionage in the United States
- China Lobby in the United States
- China–United States trade war, since 2018
- East Asia–United States relations
- Lynching of Asian Americans
- Racism in the United States
- Stereotypes of East Asians in the United States
- Stop AAPI Hate
- Stop Asian Hate
