= Anti-Japanese sentiment in the United States =

Anti-Japanese sentiment in the United States has existed since the late 19th century, especially during the Yellow Peril, which had also extended to other Asian immigrants.

Anti-Japanese sentiment against American citizens of Japanese descent in the United States would peak during World War II, when the Empire of Japan became involved in the Pacific War theater. After the war, the rise of Japan as a major economic power in the 1970s was seen as a widespread economic threat to the United States and also led to a renewal of anti-Japanese sentiment, known as Japan bashing.

== Origins ==
In the United States, anti-Japanese sentiment had its beginnings well before World War II. Racial prejudice against Asian immigrants began building soon after Chinese workers started arriving in the country in the mid-19th century, and set the tone for the resistance Japanese would face in the decades to come. Although Chinese were heavily recruited in the mining and railroad industries initially, whites in Western states and territories came to view the immigrants as a source of economic competition and a threat to racial purity as their population increased. A network of anti-Chinese groups (many of which would reemerge in the anti-Japanese movement) worked to pass laws that limited Asian immigrants' access to legal and economic equality with whites. Most important of these discriminatory laws was the exclusion of Asians from citizenship rights. The Naturalization Act of 1870 revised the previous law, under which only white immigrants could become U.S. citizens, to extend eligibility to people of African descent. By designating Asians as permanent aliens, the law prohibited them from voting and serving on juries, which, combined with laws that prevented people of color from testifying against whites in court, made it virtually impossible for Asian Americans to participate in the country's legal and political systems. Also significant were alien land laws, which relied on coded language barring "aliens ineligible for citizenship" from owning land or real estate, and in some cases from even entering into a temporary lease, to discourage Asian immigrants from establishing homes and businesses in over a dozen states. These laws were greatly detrimental to the newly arrived immigrants, since many of them were farmers and had little choice but to become migrant workers.

After the Chinese Exclusion Act of 1882 stopped immigration from China, American labor recruiters began targeting Japanese workers, triggering a rapid increase in the country's Japanese population, which in turn triggered the movement to decrease their number and restrict their economic and political power. Some cite the formation of the Asiatic Exclusion League as the start of the anti-Japanese movement in California, where, along with the Japanese American population, the exclusion movement was centered. Their efforts focused on ending Japanese immigration and, as with the previous anti-Chinese movement, nativist groups like the Asiatic Exclusion League lobbied to limit and finally, with the Immigration Act of 1924, ban Japanese and other East Asians from entering the U.S. However, in the process they created an atmosphere of systematic hostility and discrimination that would later contribute to the push to incarcerate 120,000 Japanese Americans during World War II.

== Early 20th century ==
Young China Club warning to American visitors against buying Japanese goods in San Francisco's Chinatown c. 1940

Anti-Japanese racism and fear of the Yellow Peril had become increasingly xenophobic in California after the Japanese victory over the Russian Empire in the Russo-Japanese War. On October 11, 1906, the San Francisco, California Board of Education passed a regulation whereby children of Japanese descent would be required to attend racially segregated and separate schools. At the time, Japanese immigrants made up approximately 1% of the population of California; many of them had come under the treaty in 1894 which had assured free immigration from Japan.

In 1907, Californian nativists supporting exclusion of Japanese immigrants and maintenance of segregated schools for Caucasian and Japanese students rioted in San Francisco.

=== Anti-Japanese organizations ===
- California Farm Bureau
- California Joint Immigration Committee
- Committee of One Thousand
- Japanese Exclusion League of California
- Native Sons and Daughters of the Golden West
- Anti-Japanese League of Washington

=== Alien land laws ===
The California Alien Land Law of 1913 was specifically created to prevent land ownership among Japanese citizens who were residing in the state of California. In State of California v. Jukichi Harada (1918), Judge Hugh H. Craig sided with the defendant and ruled that American children – who happened to be born to Japanese parents – had the right to own land. California proceeded to strengthen its Alien land law in 1920 and 1923.

Other states passes similar laws including Washington in 1921 and Oregon in 1923.

In State of California v. Oyama (1948), the U.S. Supreme Court ruled that California's Alien Land Law was anti-Japanese in concept, and deemed unfit to stand in America's law books. Justices Murphy and Rutledge wrote:

This measure, though limited to agricultural lands, represented the first official act of discrimination aimed at the Japanese. . . The immediate purpose, of course, was to restrict Japanese farm competition.

The more basic purpose of the statute was to irritate the Japanese, to make economic life in California as uncomfortable and unprofitable for them as legally possible.

Vigorous enforcement of the Alien Land Law has been but one of the cruel discriminatory actions which have marked this nation's treatment since 1941 of those residents who chanced to be of Japanese origin.

Can a state disregard in this manner the historic ideal that those within the borders of this nation are not to be denied rights and privileges because they are of a particular race? I say that it cannot.

It took four years for California's Supreme Court to concede that the law was unconstitutional, in State of California v. Fujii (1952). Finally, in 1956, California voters repealed the law.

=== Anti-Japanese immigration agreements and legislation ===
In 1907, the Gentlemen's Agreement was an informal deal between the governments of Japan and the U.S. It ended the immigration of Japanese laborers, though it did allow the immigration of spouses and children of Japanese immigrants already in the United States.

The Immigration Act of 1924 banned the immigration of all but a few token Japanese. Passage of the Immigration Act contributed to the growth of anti-Americanism and ending of a growing democratic movement in Japan during this time period, opening the door to Japanese militarist government control.

=== Japanese military activity prior to American entry in World War II ===
The Japanese invasion of China in 1931 and the annexation of Manchuria was roundly criticized in the US. In addition, efforts by citizens who were outraged by Japanese atrocities, such as the Nanjing Massacre, led to calls for American economic intervention to encourage Japan to leave China; these calls played a role in shaping American foreign policy. As more and more unfavorable reports of Japanese actions came to the attention of the American government, embargoes on oil and other supplies were placed on Japan, out of concern for the safety of the Chinese populace and concern for the safety of American interests in the Pacific.

Chinese Americans were again distressed when an estimated 150,000 Taishanese locals died from starvation in Taishan County by the Japanese blockade, as Taishan County was the homeland of most Chinese Americans at that time.

When the Second Sino-Japanese War broke out in 1937, Western public opinion was decidedly pro-China, with eyewitness reports by Western journalists on atrocities committed against Chinese civilians further strengthening anti-Japanese sentiments. African American sentiments at the time could be quite different than the mainstream, with organizations like the Pacific Movement of the Eastern World (PMEW) which promised equality and land distribution under Japanese rule. The PMEW had thousands of members hopefully preparing for liberation from white supremacy with the arrival of the Japanese Imperial Army.

== World War II ==
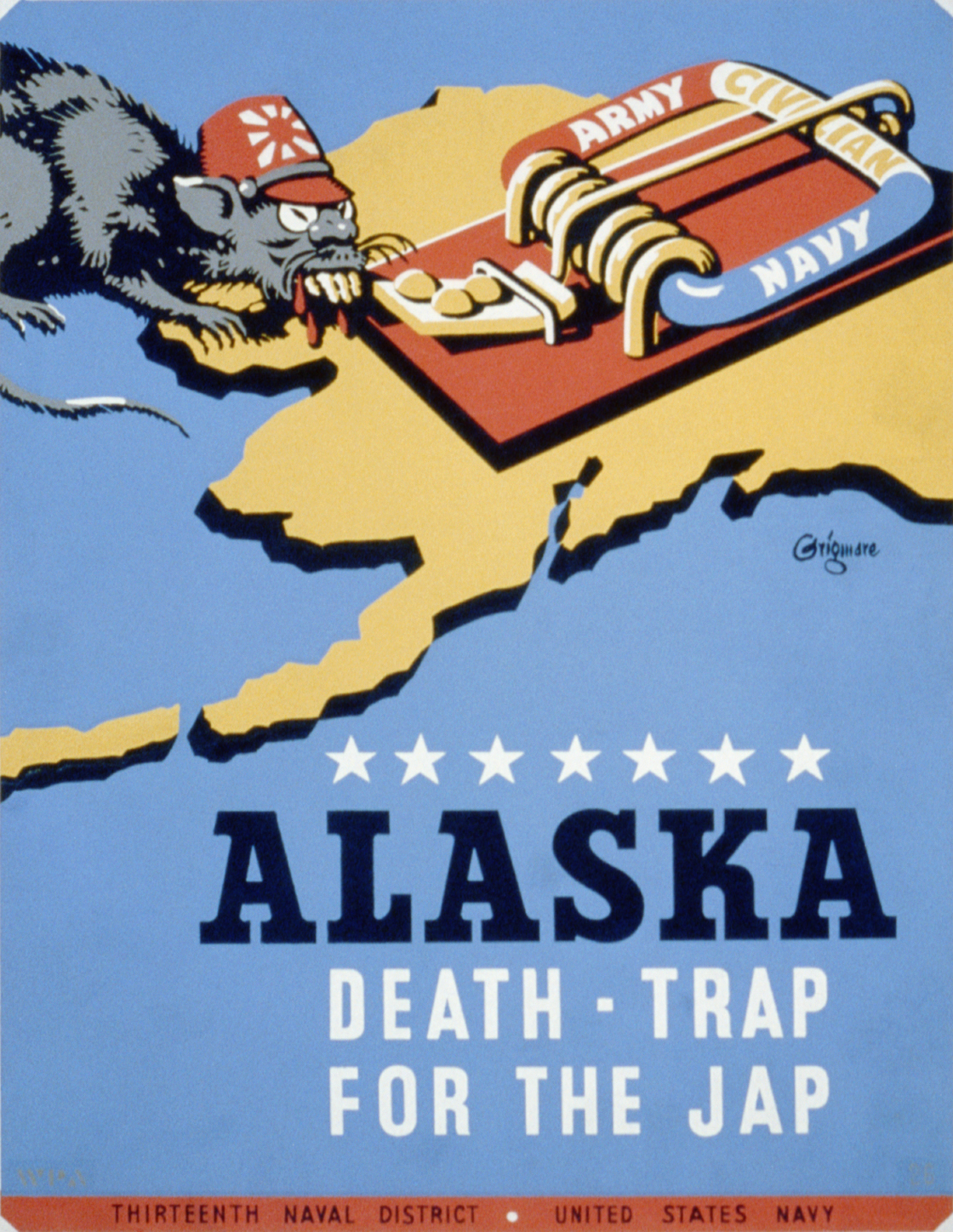
An American propaganda poster equating Japanese soldiers with vermin.

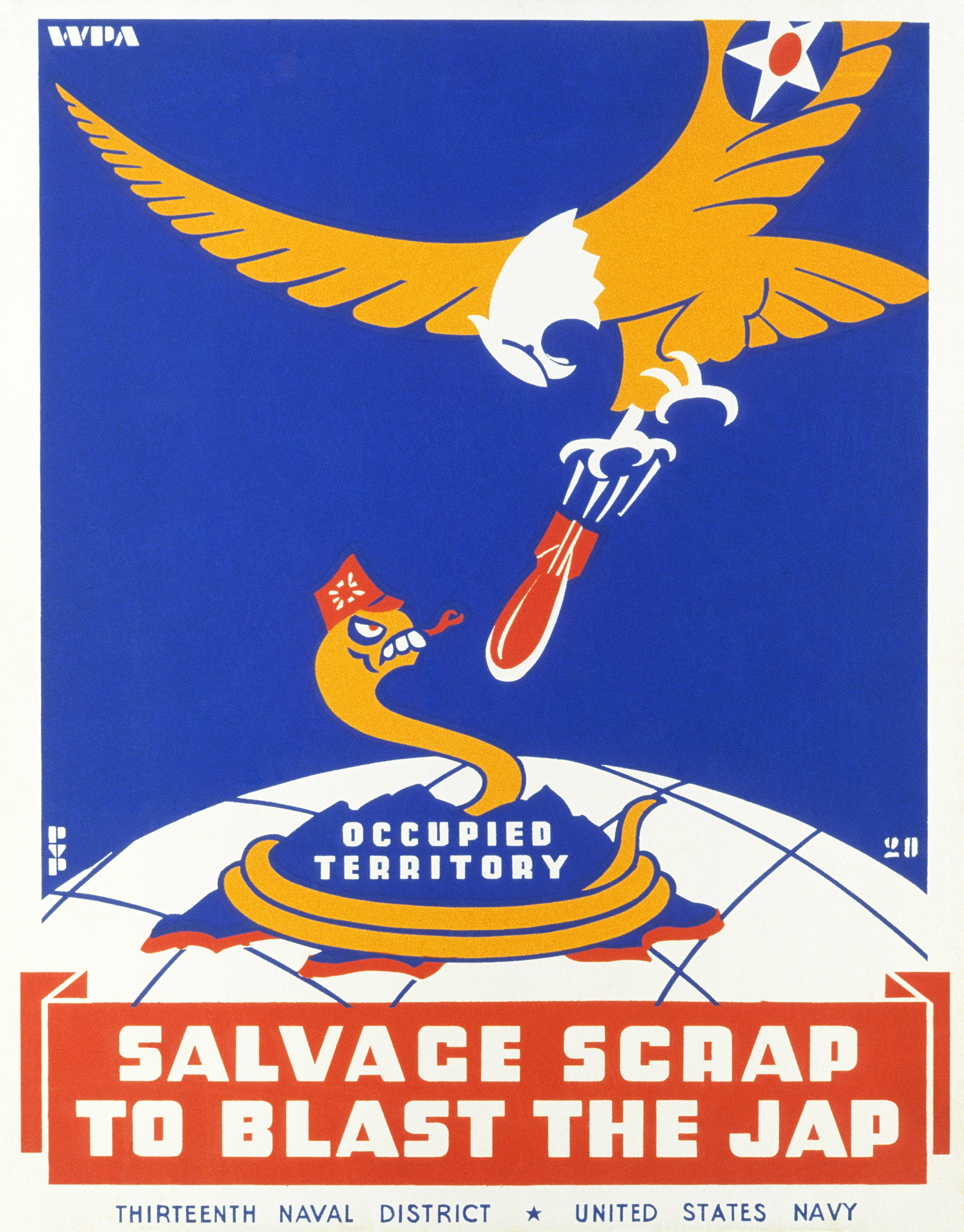
An American propaganda poster depicting Japan as a serpent, using the implication of Japanese extermination to motivate civilians to contribute to the war effort by collecting and recycling scrap metal.

The most profound cause of anti-Japanese sentiment outside of Asia had its beginning in the attack on Pearl Harbor, as it propelled the United States into World War II. The Americans were unified by the attack to fight against the Empire of Japan and its allies, the German Reich and the Kingdom of Italy.

The bombing of Pearl Harbor by Japan on the neutral United States without warning and the deaths of almost 2,500 people during ongoing U.S./Japanese peace negotiations was presented to the American populace as an act of treachery, barbarism, and cowardice. Following the attack, many non-governmental "Jap hunting licenses" were circulated around the country. Life magazine published an article on how to distinguish a Japanese person from a Chinese person by the shape of the nose and the stature of the body. Japanese conduct during the war did little to quell anti-Japanese sentiment. Fanning the flames of outrage were the treatment of American and other prisoners of war. Military-related outrages included the murder of POWs, the use of POWs as slave labor for Japanese industries, the Bataan Death March, the kamikaze attacks on Allied ships, and atrocities committed on Wake Island and elsewhere. The Guadalacanal Diary, which was published in 1943, wrote about the accounts of American soldiers, collecting Japanese 'gold teeth' or body parts such as hands or ears, to keep as trophies. The diary became extremely popular within the United States during the Second World war.

U.S. historian James J. Weingartner attributes the very low number of Japanese in U.S. POW compounds to two key factors: a Japanese reluctance to surrender and a widespread American "conviction that the Japanese were 'animals' or 'subhuman' and unworthy of the normal treatment accorded to POWs." The latter reasoning is supported by Niall Ferguson, who says that "Allied troops often saw the Japanese in the same way that Germans regarded Russians [sic] — as Untermenschen." Weingartner believes this explains the fact that a mere 604 Japanese captives were alive in Allied POW camps by October 1944.

Ulrich Straus, a U.S. Japanologist, believed that front line troops intensely hated Japanese military personnel and were "not easily persuaded" to take or protect prisoners. They believed that Allied personnel who surrendered got "no mercy" from the Japanese. Allied soldiers believed that Japanese soldiers were inclined to feign surrender, in order to make surprise attacks. Therefore, according to Straus, "[s]enior officers opposed the taking of prisoners[,] on the grounds that it needlessly exposed American troops to risks..."

=== Jap hunts ===
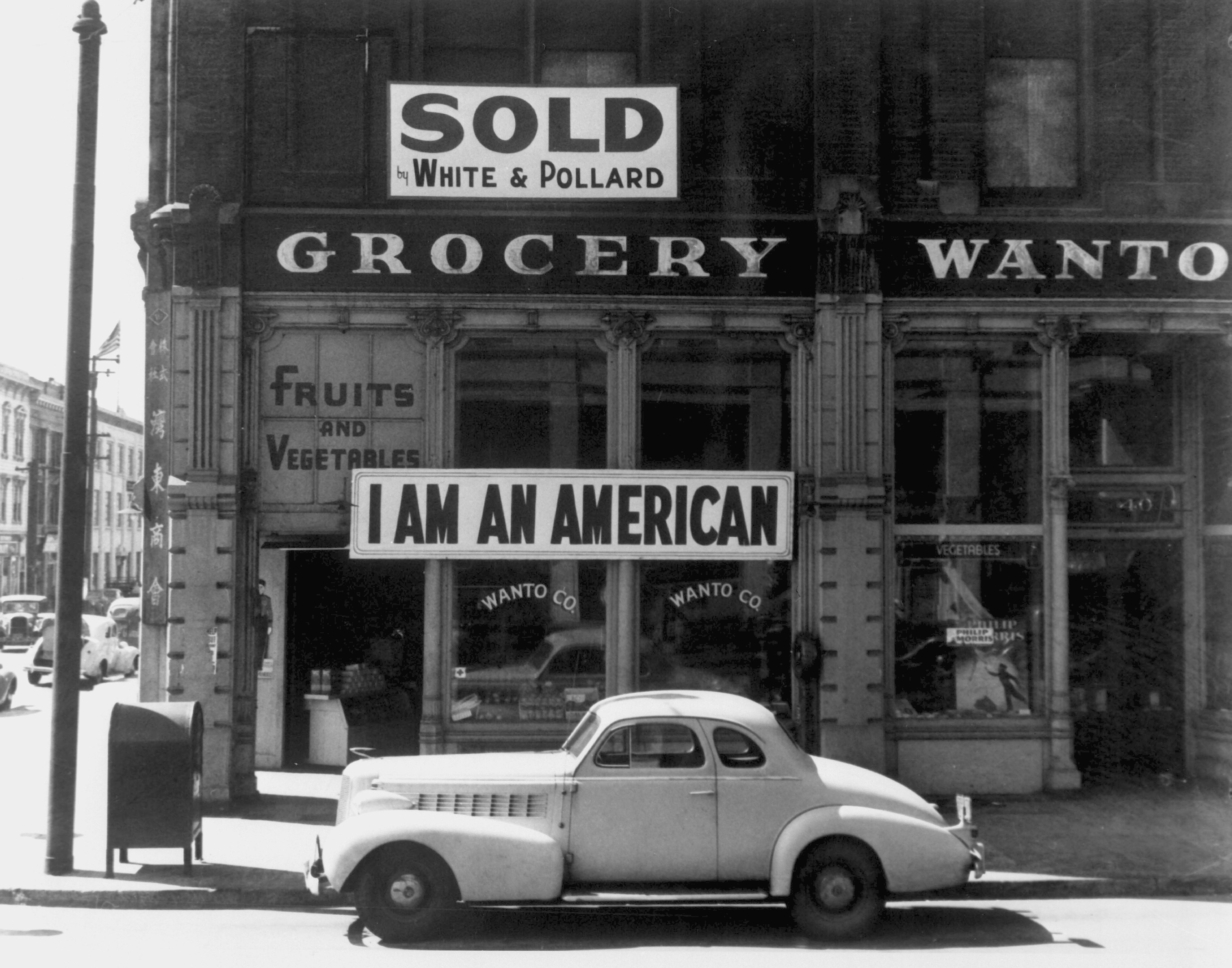
A Japanese American unfurled this banner the day after the Pearl Harbor attack. Nonetheless, the man was later detained. This photograph was taken by Dorothea Lange in March 1942, just prior to the Japanese American internment.

The attack on Pearl Harbor on December 7, 1941, plunged the United States into war and planted the notion that the Japanese were treacherous and barbaric in the minds of Americans. The hysteria which enveloped the West Coast during the early months of the war, combined with long standing anti-Asian prejudices, set the stage for what was to come.

Executive Order 9066 authorized the military to exclude any person from any area of the country where national security was considered threatened. It gave the military broad authority over the civilian population without the imposition of martial law. Although the order did not mention any specific group or recommend detention, its language implied that any citizen might be removed. In practice, the order was applied almost exclusively to Japanese Americans and Japanese nationals, with only few Italian and German Americans suffering similar fates. Ultimately, approximately 110,000 Japanese nationals and Japanese Americans were interned in housing facilities called "War Relocation Camps".

After the surprise attack on Pearl Harbor, much anti-Japanese paraphernalia and propaganda surfaced in the United States. An example of this was the so-called "Jap hunting license", a faux-official document, button or medallion that purported to authorize "open season" on "hunting" the Japanese, despite the fact that over a quarter of a million Americans at that time were of Japanese origin. Some reminded holders that there was "no limit" on the number of "Japs" they could "hunt or trap". These "licenses" often characterized Japanese people as sub-human. Many of the "Jap Hunting Licenses", for example, depicted the Japanese in animalistic fashion.

Edmund Russell writes that, whereas in Europe Americans perceived themselves to be struggling against "great individual monsters", such as Adolf Hitler, Benito Mussolini, and Joseph Goebbels, Americans often saw themselves fighting against a "nameless mass of vermin", in regards to Japan. Russell attributes this to the outrage of Americans in regards to the bombing of Pearl Harbor, the Bataan Death March, the torture and killing of American POWs in the hands of Imperial Japanese forces, and the perceived "inhuman tenacity" demonstrated in the refusal of Imperial forces to surrender. Kamikaze suicide bombings, according to John Morton Blum, were instrumental in confirming this stereotype of the "insane martial spirit" of Imperial Japan, and the bigoted picture it would engender of the Japanese people as a whole.

Commonwealth troops also employed rhetoric of "hunting", in regards to their engagement with Imperial Japanese forces. According to T. R. Moreman, the demonization of the Japanese served "to improve morale, foster belief that the war in the Far East was worthwhile and build the moral component of fighting power". Training instruction issued by the headquarters of 5th Indian Division suggested, "The JAP is a fanatic and therefore a menace until he is dead!... It will be our fanatical aim to KILL JAPS. Hunt him and kill him like any other wild beast!"

US Professor of Japanese History, John Dower, introduces his 'War Hates and War Crimes' by quoting American Historian, Allan Nevins, that 'no foe has been so detested as were the Japanese', in his essay about the Second World War. Dower highlights how the Japanese were more despised than the Germans by the American public, and he claims that it was a result of racial hatred. This racial element separated Japanese and Germans, as Dower presents how Germans could be distinguished as "good" or "bad", whereas the 'savage' and 'brutal' traits associated with the Japanese military in the war, were just seen as being "Japanese". Magazines like Time hammered this home even further by frequently referring to "the Jap" rather than "Japs", thereby denying the enemy even the merest semblance of pluralism.

=== Strategic bombing of Japan ===
Author John M. Curatola wrote that the anti-Japanese sentiment probably played a role in the strategic bombing of Japanese cities, which began on March 9/10, 1945, with the destructive Operation Meetinghouse firebombing of Tokyo to August 15, 1945, with the surrender of Japan. Sixty-nine cities in Japan lost significant areas and hundreds of thousands of civilian lives to firebombing and nuclear attacks from United States Army Air Forces B-29 Superfortress bombers during this period.

=== Internment of Japanese Americans ===
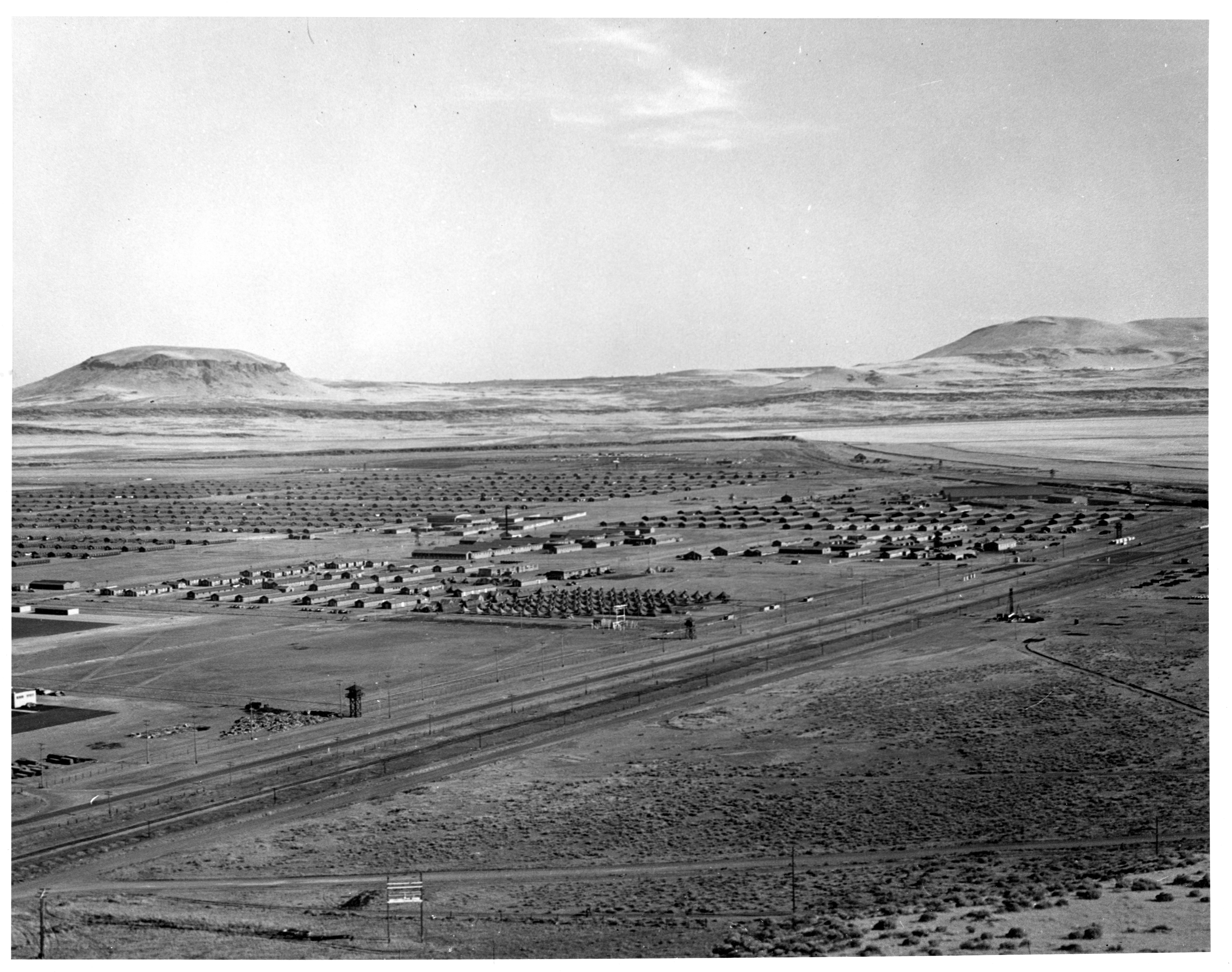
The Tule Lake War Relocation Center

An estimated 112,000 to 120,000 Japanese migrants and Japanese Americans from the West Coast were interned regardless of their attitude to the U.S. or Japan. They were held for the duration of the war in the inner U.S. The large Japanese population of Hawaii was not massively relocated in spite of their proximity to vital military areas.

In 1942, with the Japanese incarcerated in ten American concentration camps, California Attorney General Earl Warren saw his chance and approved the state takeover of twenty parcels of land held in the name of American children of Japanese parents, in absentia. In 1943, Governor Warren signed a bill that expanded the Alien Land Law by denying the Japanese the opportunity to farm as they had before World War II. In 1945, he followed up by signing two bills that facilitated the seizure of land owned by American descendants of the Japanese.

In a December 19, 1944 opinion poll, it was found that 13% of the U.S. public were in favor of the extermination of all Japanese, as well as 50% of American GI's. Dower suggests the racial hatred of the front-lines in the war rubbed off onto the American public, through media representation of Japanese and propaganda.

== Since World War II ==
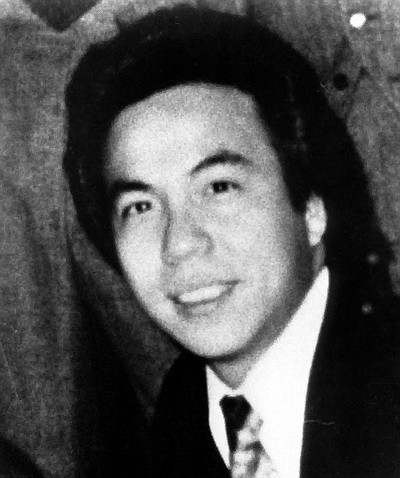
The 1982 killing of Vincent Chin, a Chinese American man who was mistaken for Japanese, became a flashpoint for Asian-American civil rights activism.

In the 1970s and 1980s, the waning fortunes of heavy industry in the United States prompted layoffs and hiring slowdowns just as counterpart businesses in Japan were making major inroads into U.S. markets. Nowhere was this more visible than in the automobile industry, where the then-lethargic Big Three automobile manufacturers (General Motors, Ford, and Chrysler) watched as their former customers bought Japanese imports from Honda, Toyota and Nissan, a consequence of the 1973 oil crisis. The anti-Japanese sentiment manifested itself in occasional public destruction of Japanese cars, and in the 1982 murder of Vincent Chin, a Chinese American beaten to death when he was mistaken to be Japanese. Chin's murder and the light sentences given to his killers became major turning points in Asian-American civil rights activism and a rallying cry for increased hate crime legislation. In 1987, after the Toshiba–Kongsberg scandal a group of Republican US congressmen smashed Toshiba products on Capitol Hill. Pictures of the event were replayed hundreds of times on Japanese television.

Other highly symbolic deals—including the sale of famous American commercial and cultural symbols such as Columbia Records, Columbia Pictures, and the Rockefeller Center building to Japanese firms—further fanned anti-Japanese sentiment. When the Seattle Mariners were being sold to Nintendo of America, 71 percent of Americans opposed the sale of an American baseball team to a Japanese corporation.

Popular culture of the period reflected American's growing distrust of Japan. Futuristic period pieces such as Back to the Future Part II and RoboCop 3 frequently showed Americans as working precariously under Japanese superiors. Criticism was also lobbied in many novels of the day. Author Michael Crichton took a break from science fiction to write Rising Sun, a murder mystery (later made into a feature film) involving Japanese businessmen in the U.S. Likewise, in Tom Clancy's book Debt of Honor, Clancy implies that Japan's prosperity is due primarily to unequal trading terms, and portrays Japan's business leaders acting in a power hungry cabal.

As argued by Marie Thorsten, however, Japanophobia mixed with Japanophilia during Japan's peak moments of economic dominance during the 1980s. The fear of Japan became a rallying point for techno-nationalism, the imperative to be first in the world in mathematics, science and other quantifiable measures of national strength necessary to boost technological and economic supremacy. Notorious "Japan bashing" took place alongside the image of Japan as superhuman, mimicking in some ways the image of the Soviet Union after it launched the first Sputnik satellite in 1957: both events turned the spotlight on American education. American bureaucrats purposely pushed this analogy. In 1982, Ernest Boyer, a former U.S. Commissioner of Education, publicly declared that, "What we need is another Sputnik" to re-boot American education, and that "maybe what we should do is get the Japanese to put a Toyota into orbit". Japan was both a threat and a model for human resource development in education and the workforce, merging with the image of Asian-Americans as the "model minority".

Both the animosity and super-humanizing which peaked in the 1980s, when the term "Japan bashing" became popular, had largely faded by the late 1990s. Japan's waning economic fortunes in the 1990s, known today as the Lost Decade, coupled with an upsurge in the U.S. economy as the Internet took off largely crowded anti-Japanese sentiment out of the popular media.

(In an interview with the Columbia Journalism Review in 1992, Robert Angel, from 1977-1984 President and CEO of the Japan Economic Institute, claimed he had invented the term “Japan bashing” in 1981, as a means to make overt criticism of Japan unacceptable.)

== See also ==
- Anti-Americanism § Japan
- Anti-Chinese sentiment in the United States
- Anti-Korean sentiment in the United States
- Anti-Japaneseism
- Japan–United States relations
- Japanese American Citizens League
- Lynching of Asian Americans
- Nativism (politics) in the United States
- Stereotypes of East Asians in the United States
- Killing of Vincent Chin

== Cited sources ==
- Weingartner, James J. (February 1992). "Trophies of War: U.S. Troops and the Mutilation of Japanese War Dead, 1941-1945". Pacific Historical Review. 61 (1): 53–67. doi:10.2307/3640788. JSTOR 3640788. Archived from the original on August 11, 2011. "U.S. Marines on their way to Guadalcanal relished the prospect of making necklaces of Japanese gold teeth and "pickling" Japanese ears" as keepsakes."
- Bagby, Wesley Marvin (1999). America's International Relations Since World War I. Oxford University Press. ISBN 0-19-512389-1.
- Schaffer, Ronald (1985). Wings of Judgment: American Bombing in World War II. New York: Oxford University Press. ISBN 0-19-503629-8. OCLC 11785450.
