= Anti-Korean sentiment in the United States =

History of racial discrimination

In this 1905 issue of the satirical magazine Puck, a diminutive Korean seonbi (bottom of image, slightly to left of center) is portrayed as being of knee-height compared to other races.

Anti-Korean sentiment in the United States has historically included the following elements: In the late 19th or early 20th century, those who sympathized with Japanese imperialism showed anti-Korean racism; in the late 20th century, there was a conflict between the African-American and Korean-American communities, which led to violence and murder against Koreans with the 1992 Los Angeles riots.

== Early history ==
For much of the US's early relationship with Korea, the overall American public was overwhelmingly disinterested in or even unaware of Korea. The perception of Korea by politicians and the press, however, began much more negatively.

Korea's earliest interactions with the US caused it to gain notoriety with American politicians and press. The 1866 General Sherman incident, in which Koreans destroyed and killed the crew of a US ship that was illegally navigating its rivers, drew widespread condemnation in American newspapers. The New York Tribune wrote:

Of Corea [sic], a country in North-Eastern Asia, little is known. It is nominally tributary to China, and is inhabited by a semi-barbarous people, extremely jealous of foreigners, with whom they hold but a very limited intercourse.

Koreans were widely portrayed as vicious, xenophobic, and savage "orientals" that rejected the ideals of the civilized West. The following 1871 United States expedition to Korea and its ensuing conflict also contributed to these negative perceptions. The American press mostly reacted positively to the Joseon–United States Treaty of 1882.

For decades, most publications portrayed Korea as backwards, poor, and inferior to Japan. Most exoticized the country with nicknames such as "The Hermit Kingdom" and "The Land of Hats". W. C. Kitchin wrote in his 1884 book Christianity in Corea: Many publications commented negatively on the poor social status of Korean women. One newspaper headline read "Corean [sic] Women: Noble Ladies and Degraded Slave Girls of the Hermit Kingdom: They are More Secluded than Turks and Have Few Rights Respected by Man".

The story is told by those who have seen it that it takes three able-bodied Coreans to run a common spade. The people are extremely indolent and as a consequence miserably poor.

The minority of American journalists, politicians, and activists who visited Korea generally held more favorable opinions of it, and some expressed frustration at the negative opinions of their countrymen.

== During Japanese colonization ==
Initially, sentiments towards the Japanese colonization of Korea were positive.

US President Theodore Roosevelt was an outspoken critic of Joseon and Korean people. He described Koreans as "unenlightened and recalcitrant" and proudly called himself "pro-Japanese". These sentiments were mostly shared by other high-level US officials, who felt that colonization by the more-enlightened Japanese would be beneficial to Korea. Negative impressions may have been somewhat influenced by "Japanese information channels", which had significantly higher funding and reach in the US than any Korean sources did.

In 1894, an article in the New York Herald declared:

[Japan] has the right to occupy Corea in the interest of the commerce and civilization of the Western world. She will remain in Corea as warder of the little kingdom just emerging from the Chinese darkness, assisting her in moral, intellectual, and material development, leaving the country when her work is done, when the Hermit Kingdom has been place on the proper pathway of good government. Like Japan, and through Japan, Corea must be made the outpost of Western civilization and commerce against Mongolian decrepitude and exclusiveness.

However, writings about Korea became more sympathetic in the late 1910s, after information about Japan's Twenty-One Demands to China became public knowledge, and after Japan's violent suppression of the Korean March First Movement in 1919.

Before World War II, parts of the African American community began viewing the Empire of Japan favorably, as they saw Japan as a challenger to the White West. Several prominent African American intellectuals, including W. E. B. Du Bois, published sympathetic writings that attempted to justify Japanese colonialism in Korea and China. Du Bois wrote:

Japan is regarded by all colored peoples as their logical leader, as the one non-white nation which has escaped forever the dominance and exploitation of the white world... Has she seized Korea, Formosa and Manchuria? [...] She has simply done what England has done in Hong Kong and France in Annam, and what Russia, Germany and perhaps even the United States intended to do in China... And yet in all her action there has been this vast difference: her program cannot be one based on race hate for the conquered, since racially these latter are one with the Japanese and are recognized as blood relatives. Their eventual assimilation, the accord of social equality to them, will present no real problem.

Several Black Americans criticized Japanese imperialism, but according to historian Marc S. Gallicchio, the majority were more likely to describe criticism of Japan as Western prejudice and insecurity. A. Phillip Randolph and Chandler Owen wrote in 1919 that:

The smug and oily Japanese diplomats are no different from Woodrow Wilson, Lloyd George or Orlando. They care nothing for even the Japanese people and at this very same moment are suppressing and oppressing mercilessly the people of Korea and forcing hard bargains upon unfortunate China.

== Modern ==
The 1992 Los Angeles riots were partially motivated by Anti-Korean sentiment among African Americans, and famously lead to the rise of the phrase "roof Koreans" or "rooftop Koreans". A year before the riots, on March 16, 1991, Korean American store owner Soon Ja Du fatally shot 15-year-old African American Latasha Harlins. This incident and other tensions became a significant part of the 1992 riots, which were sparked by alleged police brutality towards Rodney King. The protests saw mass ransacking and destruction of Korean American and other Asian-owned stores in the Koreatown, Los Angeles area by groups of African-Americans, as well as armed Korean Americans defending stores from the rooftops of buildings. Both Koreans and African Americans were killed in the riots. Of the $1 billion in damages the city experienced, around half was suffered by Korean business owners.

== See also ==
- Anti–North Korean sentiment § United States
- Anti-Japanese sentiment in the United States
- Anti-Chinese sentiment in the United States
