= Rotating pocket heater =

A rotating pocket heater, also called pocket heater or Kinder heater, holds and rotates a substrate during vacuum deposition. During rotation, the substrate is sequentially exposed to more than one environment, for example, heat, oxygen, metal vapor, etc. Rotating pocket heaters has been used in reactive evaporation system to create YBa_{2}Cu_{3}O_{7} layers on planar semiconductor wafers.

== Magnesium diboride ==
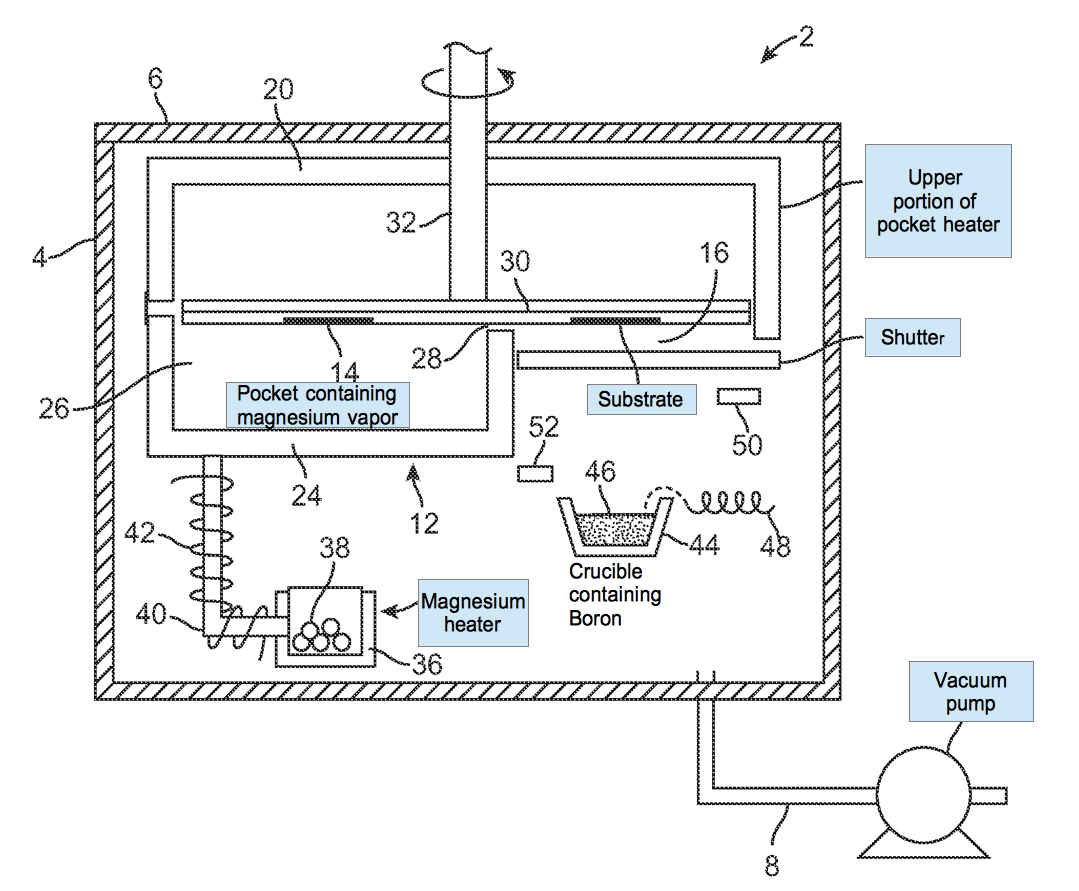
Rotating pocket heater cross section

The illustration on the right shows an example of a pocket heater being used to deposit a layers of magnesium diboride on a substrate. A vertical shaft (32) turns a horizontal disk (30) several hundred rotations per minute (RPM). The illustration shows two of several substrates (14) attached to the underside of the rotating disk. The substrates are attached at their edges, so that most of the undersides of the substrates are exposed to the vapor below. The entire apparatus is enclosed in a chamber kept at low pressure by a vacuum pump.

Magnesium diboride (MgB_{2}) is an ionic solid with superconducting properties. Vapor deposition is difficult, because the vapor pressure of magnesium is much higher than boron. The pocket heater solves this problem by providing a separate environment for each material.

== Spying charge ==
In May 2015, FBI agents arrested Professor Xiaoxing Xi, chairman of Temple University's physics department, accusing him of sharing schematics of a pocket heater with Chinese scientists. The prosecutors dropped all charges in September 2015 after it was shown that they had misconstrued the evidence and Xi has never shared the diagram of the pocket heater with anyone in China. Rotating pocket heater is not a restricted technology and was first invented by German physicists Berberich, Prusseit, and Kinder. Theva Dunnschichttechnik GmbH of Germany holds the patent for pocket heater.
