= Ulrich A. Straus =

American diplomat

- Born: 1926; Germany
- Died: August 25, 2017; United States of America
- Spouse: Sarah Wolcott
- Military career
- Allegiance: United States

Ulrich A. Straus (1926 – 25 August 2017) served as an American diplomat for 30 years, serving in the United States Department of State with positions including United States Counsel General in Okinawa (1978–1982) and Country Director for the Philippines (1982–1984).

== Early life ==
Urlich A. Straus was born in Würzburg, Germany in 1926. He moved with his family first to Japan in 1933. In 1940, Straus' family were granted American visas and moved to the United States. Upon finishing high school Straus enrolled in the University of Michigan. There he participated in the Japanese Military Intelligence Service Language School despite being a civilian. Straus was drafted into the military shortly afterwards.

== Military career ==
Upon entering the military, Straus' first assignment was the International Military Tribunal for the Far East. Speaking German, English and Japanese, Straus was tasked with translating German Foreign Office communications with Japan during the Second World War into English and Japanese to be presented as evidence at the Tribunal. After his participation in the Tribunal ended Straus was transferred to G-2 military intelligence. In 1948 Straus took a short break from the military going back to University of Michigan. At the university, he received an undergraduate degree in Japanese Language and Literature. He received a Master's degree in Political Science and began work on a doctorate in Political Science. He was recalled to the military in 1951. During the Korean War, Straus served once again in military intelligence. He was deployed to Japan for a year and a half in this capacity. He left the military permanently in 1953.

== State Department ==
=== Early career ===
Straus was awarded a Fulbright scholarship to study at Keio University in Japan to study for a PhD. During this time, he took the Foreign Service exam and passed in 1955. The following year he passed the oral examination. In 1957 he formally joined the State Department. Straus' first assignment within State was the Bureau of Intelligence and Research (INR). He served on this desk from 1957-1959. After his service at INR Straus was once again relocated to Japan serving in the political section as labor attaché from 1959 to 1964. His primary task was to act as liaison between Japanese labor groups, the Japanese government and the United States Embassy. In 1965 Straus was transferred to the United States Berlin Office. Here he acted as Labor Attaché and Berlin Access Officer. In 1967, Straus was transferred from his positions in Berlin to the Japan Desk within the State Department in Washington DC. He served as the Political and Military Officer in addition to dealing with internal Japanese affairs. In 1970 Straus was given a new assignment in the Arms Control department during the SALT I treaty talks. After this assignment he spent 6 months at the NATO Defense College in Rome before being placed in Bern, Switzerland. In Bern, Straus was the Political Counselor and the Public Affairs Officer. No major events occurred in U.S.-Swiss relations during this period. After his tenure in Switzerland, Straus became African Bureau Deputy Director of the Office of Inter-African Affairs. In this assignment he dealt primarily with the Horn of African Ethiopia and Somalia. In 1978, Straus obtained the rank of Counsel General when he was granted the Counsel General position of Okinawa.

=== Counsel General ===
At the time of Straus' service as Counsel General in Okinawa, he represented the 50,000 United States military personnel and dependents stationed at the various United States military bases located there. His primary duty was to foster cooperation between the United States military presence on the island, the Okinawan Authorities and the Japanese Authorities. No major incidents occurred while Straus was station chief. After his successful posting to Okinawa, Straus was moved in 1982 to the Philippines as the Country director.

=== Country Director ===
The year 1982 was a time of instability in the Philippines. The New People's Army, a terrorist group, was perceived to be increasing in strength while the Marcos regime was resorting to more authoritarian measures in governance all while the economy was in decline. It was in these circumstances that Straus assumed his position as Country Director for the Philippines in the State Department. During Straus' time as Country Director the assassination of Beningo Aquino occurred, leading to unrest and the eventual end of the Marcos regime. Straus participated in the renegotiation of United States military base rights in the Philippines. After the assassination the situation within the Philippines deteriorated further. Straus was moved out in 1984.

=== War College ===
From 1984 to 1987, Ulrich Straus taught as a State Department instructor at the United States Army War College. While at the War College, Straus taught International Relations classes in addition to teaching specialized electives in East Asian Studies. In 1987 Straus retired from the State Department.

== Personal life ==
In 1959, Ulrich Straus married Sarah Wolcott. He lived in Silver Spring, Maryland and had three children and two grandchildren.

After retiring from the State Department, Straus taught at George Washington University, the College of William and Mary, Johns Hopkins University, and Georgetown University.

== Publications ==
- Straus, Ulrich. The Anguish of Surrender: Japanese POW's of World War II. Seattle, WA: University of Washington Press, 2003. ISBN 0295983361 OCLC 52594308
