= Xiaoxing Xi =

Chinese-American physicist

Xi Xiaoxing
- Education: Peking University
- Known for: Electromagnetic properties of ultrathin films False accusation of spying
- Scientific career
- Fields: Materials physics
- Workplaces: Karlsruhe Nuclear Research Center; Rutgers University; University of Maryland; Pennsylvania State University; Temple University
- Thesis: (1987)
- Doctoral advisor: Weiyan Guan

Xiaoxing Xi (Chinese: 郗小星; pinyin: Xī Xiǎoxīng; born 1957) is a Chinese-born American materials physicist specializing in the electromagnetic properties of thin films. He is the Laura H. Carnell Professor and former chair at the Physics Department of Temple University in Philadelphia. In May 2015, the United States Department of Justice arrested him on charges of having sent restricted American technology to China. All charges against him were dropped in September 2015.

== Career ==
Xi was born in China and grew up during the Cultural Revolution. He matriculated to the physics department at Peking University in 1978 as part of the first class following the Cultural Revolution. He graduated with a BSc in physics in 1982. He studied under Weiyan Guan, and received his PhD in 1987 for work in superconductivity.

Following graduate studies, Xi was a researcher at the Karlsruhe Nuclear Research Center in Germany, where he worked on epitaxial yttrium barium copper oxide thin films. Thirumalai Venkatesan visited Karlsruhe and made offers to both Xi and his wife, who is also a physicist, to come work with him at Bell Communication Research at Rutgers University. Xi and his wife accepted Venkatesan's offer and moved to the United States in 1989. When Venkatesan moved to the University of Maryland five years later, Xi and his wife moved as well. While at Maryland Xi researched high-temperature superconductor field-effect transistors.

In 1995 Xi's wife received an offer from Pennsylvania State University and Xi received an offer as the spousal hire. There Xi shifted his research to ultrathin ferromagnetic films. Xi's wife is still a physics professor at Pennsylvania State University. While at Pennsylvania State University, Xi was nominated as a fellow of the American Physical Society by the Division of Materials Physics "for his extensive and seminal contributions to the science and applications of thin film materials including high temperature superconductors, ferroelectrics, and magnesium diboride."

In 2009 Xi became a professor at Temple University. Xi was named chairman of Temple University's physics department in 2014.

Xi has naturalized as a US citizen. He and his wife have two daughters and live in suburban Philadelphia.

== False accusation of spying ==
In 2015, police raided Xi's home and arrested him at gunpoint in front of his wife and two daughters. The US Justice Department (DOJ) had accused the scientist of illegally sending trade secrets to China: specifically, the design of a pocket heater used in superconductor research. Xi was indicted on four counts of wire fraud, putting him under threat of 80 years in prison and $1 million in fines. Xi's daughter Joyce Xi said, "newscasters surrounded our home and tried to film through windows. The FBI rummaged through all our belongings and carried off electronics and documents containing many private details of our lives. For months, we lived in fear of FBI intimidation and surveillance. We worried about our safety in public, given that my dad's face was plastered all over the news. My dad was unable to work, and his reputation was shattered."

Temple University forced Xi to take administrative leave and suspended him as chair of the Physics Department. He was also banned from accessing his lab or communicating with his students directly. It was later learned that FBI agents had been listening to his phone calls and reading his emails for months — possibly years.

In September 2015, however, the DOJ dropped all charges against him after leading scientists, including a co-inventor of the pocket heater, provided affidavits that the schematics that Xi shared with Chinese scientists were not for a pocket heater or other restricted technology. According to Xi's lawyer Peter Zeidenberg, the government did not understand the complicated science and failed to consult with experts before arresting him. He said that the information Xi shared as part of "typical academic collaboration" was about a different device, which Xi co-invented and which is not restricted technology.

In 2017 Xi filed a lawsuit suing the United States and the FBI agents over violations of fourth and fifth amendment rights. Xi is being represented in part by the American Civil Liberties Union. The suit alleges that Xi was surveilled without a warrant and the FBI knowingly made false claims. In 2021, Xi a Philadelphia court rejected his legal claims for damages. The judge ruled that the claims involved matters of discretion and judgement of the defendants. Xi's appeal was argued in September, 2022, and was allowed to move forward in May 2023. However, recent Supreme Court decisions may make it difficult to obtain damages for violations of constitutional rights.

In 2020 Xi was awarded the Andrei Sakharov Prize of the American Physical Society "For articulate and steadfast advocacy in support of the US scientific community and open scientific exchange, and especially his efforts to clarify the nature of international scientific collaboration in cases involving allegations of scientific espionage."

== Selected works ==
Xiaoxing Xi has published more than 300 research papers and holds three patents. His research focus is on materials physics, specifically the applications of epitaxial thin films and nanoscale heterostructures. His key publications include:

- Xi, X.X.; et al. (2002), "In situ epitaxial MgB2 thin films for superconducting electronics", Nature Materials, 1 (1): 35–38, arXiv:cond-mat/0203563, Bibcode:2002NatMa...1...35Z, doi:10.1038/nmat703, PMID 12618845, S2CID 5197642.
- Xi, X.X. (2008), "Two-band superconductor magnesium diboride", Reports on Progress in Physics, 71 (11) 116501, Bibcode:2008RPPh...71k6501X, doi:10.1088/0034-4885/71/11/116501, S2CID 122969621.
- Xi, X.X.; et al. (2012), "Momentum-dependent multiple gaps in magnesium diboride probed by electron tunnelling spectroscopy", Nature Communications, 3 619, Bibcode:2012NatCo...3..619C, doi:10.1038/ncomms1626, PMID 22233629.
- Xi, X.X.; et al. (2013), "Exploiting dimensionality and defect mitigation to create tunable microwave dielectrics", Nature, 502 (7472): 532–6, Bibcode:2013Natur.502..532L, doi:10.1038/nature12582, hdl:2117/21213, PMID 24132232, S2CID 4457286.
- Xi, X.X.; et al. (2014), "Atomically precise interfaces from non-stoichiometric deposition", Nature Communications, 5 4530, arXiv:1404.1374, Bibcode:2014NatCo...5.4530N, doi:10.1038/ncomms5530, PMID 25088659, S2CID 36654494.

== Honors ==
- Fellow, American Association for the Advancement of Science, 2021
- Andrei Sakharov Prize, American Physical Society, 2020
- Fellow, American Physical Society, 2007
- Career Award, National Science Foundation, 1997
- Chang Jiang Scholar, bestowed by the Chinese Ministry of Education and the Li Ka Shing Foundation, 2006
- Fellow, American Physical Society, 2007
