= Chae Chan Ping v. United States =

1889 U.S. Supreme Court decision

- Supreme Court of the United States

Argued March 28–29, 1889 Decided May 13, 1889
- Full case name: Chae Chan Ping v. United States
- Citations: 130 U.S. 581 (more) 9 S. Ct. 623; 32 L. Ed. 1068; 1889 U.S. LEXIS 1778

Case history
- Prior: Appeal from the Circuit Court of the United States for the Northern District of California

Holding
- The Scott Act of 1888 is valid; immigration and nationality laws can abrogate conflicting treaties, are within federal power, and are owed judicial deference.

Court membership
- Chief Justice Melville Fuller Associate Justices Samuel F. Miller · Stephen J. Field; Joseph P. Bradley · John M. Harlan; Horace Gray · Samuel Blatchford; Lucius Q. C. Lamar II

Case opinion
- Majority: Field, joined by unanimous

Laws applied
- U.S. Const. Art. III and Scott Act of 1888

Chae Chan Ping v. United States, 130 U.S. 581 (1889), or The Chinese Exclusion Case, is a landmark decision of the Supreme Court of the United States that upheld the constitutionality of the Scott Act of 1888, a follow-up to the Chinese Exclusion Act. The Scott Act barred Chinese laborers from reentry to the United States.

The case arose concerning Chae Chan Ping, a Chinese man who moved to the United States in 1875, lived in San Francisco for over a decade, and whose return voyage from a trip to British Hong Kong was pending when the Scott Act became effective. Ping's legal challenge to the prohibition on reentry was aided by Chinese immigrant groups and advocated on his behalf by an elite "dream team" of lawyers.

The case is viewed as "the grandfather of immigration law cases" and is significant for the "sweeping" judicial deference given to the executive and legislative branches of the federal government, as well as precedent for the plenary power and consular nonreviewability doctrines in immigration and nationality law.

== Background ==
=== Chinese immigration and early treaties ===
Beginning with the 1849 discovery of gold at Sutter's Mill, many people emigrated from China to the United States to take part in the California Gold Rush. In 1850, there were around 800 Chinese immigrants living in California, yet by 1852, that population had increased to roughly 20,000. Between 1865 and 1869, the Central Pacific Railroad Company brought many more Chinese immigrants to California to construct the first transcontinental railroad. Chinese immigrants in California during this period were subject to widespread prejudice and discrimination. In 1852, the California legislature levied a discriminatory tax on Chinese miners, the second such tax levied within two years, and in 1854, the Supreme Court of California ruled that the testimony of Chinese people was inadmissible in court.

In 1868, the United States and China negotiated the Burlingame Treaty. The terms of this treaty declared formal comity between the two nations, granted China most-favored-nation trade status, incentivized Chinese immigration to the United States, and conferred some bilateral immigration benefits. In response to anti-immigrant hostility, the Angell Treaty of 1880 was later negotiated to limit the immigration of Chinese laborers to the United States.

=== Chinese Exclusion Act and Scott Act ===
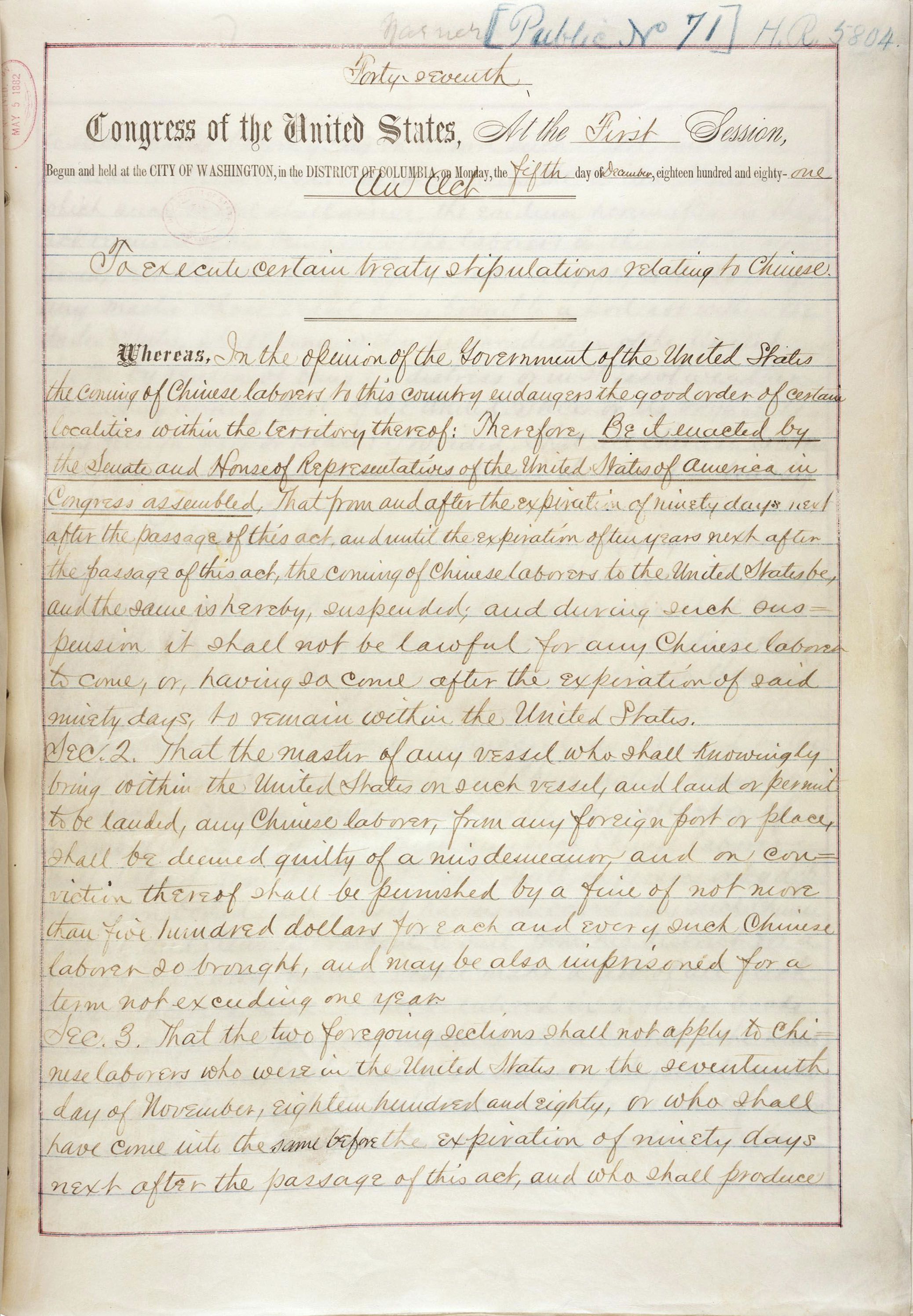
First page of the Chinese Exclusion Act, passed by Congress in 1882

Primarily motivated by economic anxiety, Congress passed the Chinese Exclusion Act of 1882, which was "widely popular across political parties" at the time of its enactment. It was the first piece of legislation in the history of immigration and nationality law in the United States to broadly limit admission by a particular class of foreigners, signaling the end of otherwise largely unrestricted immigration to the United States.

At first, enforcement of the Chinese Exclusion Act proved cumbersome, and federal court rulings narrowed its scope. The act initially barred admission only on the basis of Chinese nationality and grandfathered previously admitted Chinese immigrants, which led some new immigrants to forge evidence of prior lawful admission. In 1884, Congress amended the act to apply on the basis of Chinese ethnicity rather than nationality, require evidence of lawful admission from an American consulate, and mandate that Chinese immigrants departing the United States obtain reentry permits if they wished to return.

Following instances of violent attacks in the United States against Chinese immigrants between 1885 and 1887, such as the Rock Springs Massacre and Hells Canyon Massacre, the Chinese government sought to limit the emigration of laborers from China. While the Chinese government was in the midst of new treaty negotiations, Congress passed the Scott Act of 1888, which barred reentry of such immigrants to the United States and voided all prior reentry permits.

=== Chae Chan Ping and lower court proceedings ===
On June 2, 1887, Chae Chan Ping (simplified Chinese: 柴禅平; traditional Chinese: 柴禪平; pinyin: Chái Chánpíng), a Chinese laborer who had lived in San Francisco since 1875, departed for British Hong Kong aboard the SS Belgic. Prior to leaving the United States, he obtained a reentry permit under the provisions of the Chinese Exclusion Act, as amended in 1884, which required such documentation to secure reentry for outbound Chinese immigrants. At the time he departed, his return to the United States would have been lawful. During his absence, on October 1, 1888, Congress passed the Scott Act, which voided all reentry permits and barred the reentry of Chinese laborers abroad. Unaware of the change, Ping arrived six days later on October 7, 1888. He attempted to reenter the United States through San Francisco but was detained by the United States Customs Service.

On October 10, 1888, a petition for a writ of habeas corpus was filed on behalf of Ping, challenging both the legality of his detention and the constitutionality of the Scott Act. Prior to the Immigration and Nationality Act of 1952, habeas corpus was the only means to challenge immigration-related legal orders. The case was heard two days later before Circuit Judges Ogden Hoffman Jr. and Lorenzo Sawyer. The pair were well-versed in immigration and nationality law, presiding over a large 19th-century "habeas corpus mill" in California that entertained thousands of such cases, mainly concerning Chinese immigrants. The cases of Chinese immigrants had an impact on judges Hoffman and Sawyer, who often showed sympathy toward Chinese immigrants. Nonetheless, when required to apply the Scott Act on October 15, 1888, both agreed that the act barred the reentry of Ping, and "Sawyer went out of his way to explain that the decision he and Hoffman reached did not represent a capitulation to popular prejudice."

== Supreme Court ==
=== Arguments ===
Chae Chan Ping was represented by prominent lawyers of the 1800s, including George Hoadly, James C. Carter, and Thomas S. Riordan, all of whom had previously won cases before the federal judiciary which resulted in outcomes favorable to Chinese immigrants. Despite his lower socioeconomic status as a day laborer, Ping's high-quality "dream team" legal counsel was made possible through Chinese American benevolent societies which had recruited him as a test case to challenge Chinese exclusion. Lawyers for Ping argued that the Scott Act violated the guarantees set forth in the Burlingame Treaty. Further, they argued that Ping's reentry permit had vested him with a property right that could not be "taken away by mere legislation", so the act had deprived Ping of "life, liberty, or property, without due process of law" in violation of the Fifth Amendment.

Arguing on behalf of the United States was Solicitor General George Jenks. The State of California submitted an amicus curiae brief in favor of the federal government. The amicus brief was written by John Franklin Swift, who nine years earlier had negotiated the Angell Treaty of 1880. Lawyers for the United States framed the case in the context of the law of nations and as part of a larger foreign affairs dispute with the Chinese government. They argued that the federal government had the complete power to bar admission of Ping and any other foreigner or class of foreigners, regardless of background. It was further argued that power over foreign affairs was an exclusively federal matter.

=== Decision ===
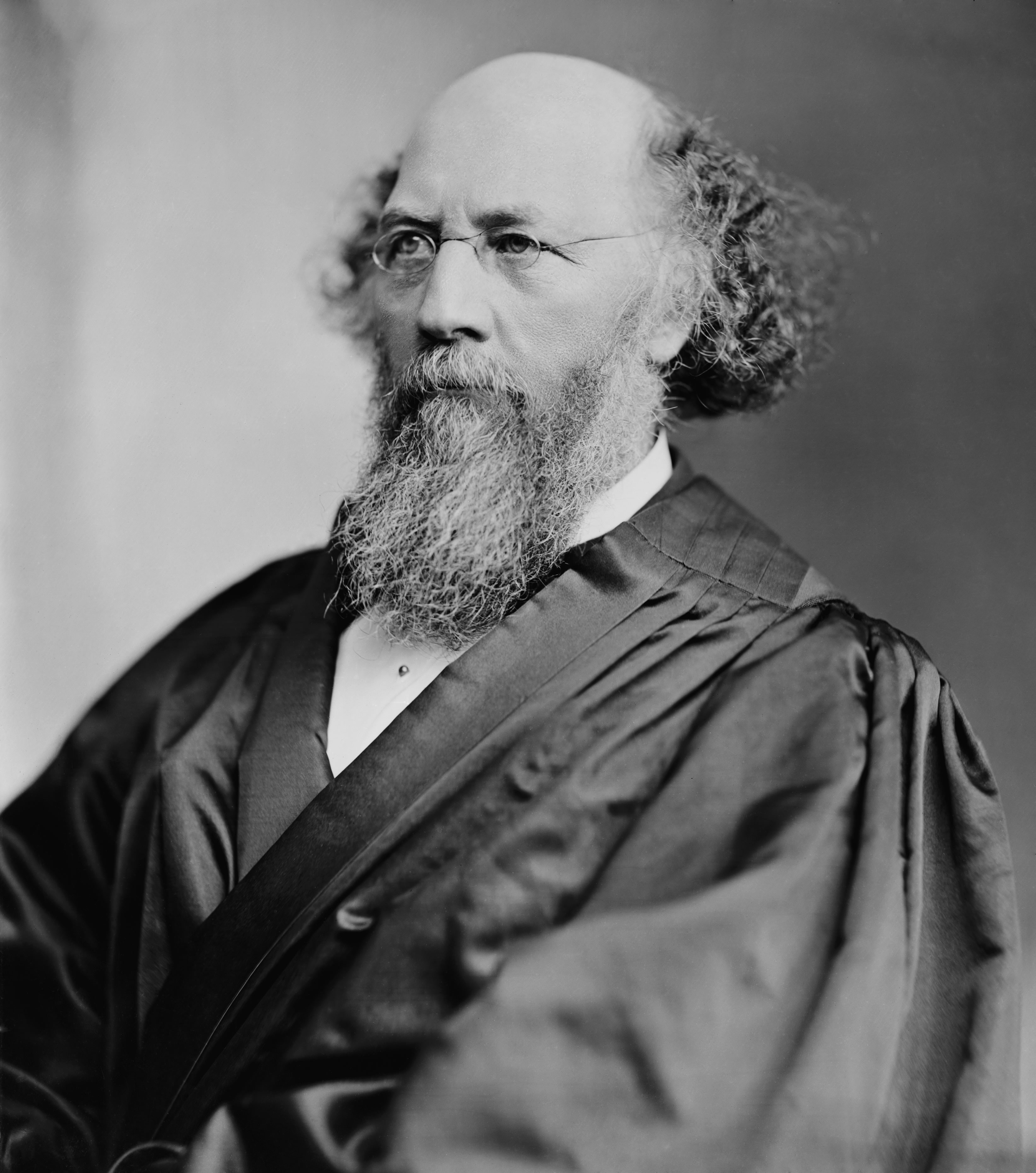
Justice Field, author of the opinion

In a unanimous decision delivered on May 13, 1889, Associate Justice Stephen Johnson Field held that the Scott Act of 1888 was constitutional; thus, Chae Chan Ping was barred from reentry to the United States and removed to China. Justice Field had once ruled, sitting by designation upon a federal trial court, against the discriminatory, anti-Chinese Pigtail Ordinance, but he later shifted his views, employing anti-immigration rhetoric in the majority opinion. First, Field addressed whether there was a conflict of laws with the act, holding that Congress had properly abrogated any conflicting treaties.

Next, Field addressed the power of government over immigration and nationality law, holding that only the federal government had such power. Field drew heavily upon accounts of the law of nations to hold that the power to exclude foreigners is "[a]n incident of sovereignty...part of those sovereign powers delegated by the Constitution." These accounts were not unique to American law and had been drawn upon earlier by other nations. Field also noted that foreign affairs powers, under the commerce, naturalization, define and punish, and war clauses of the Constitution, permitted immigration restrictions by the federal government.

After addressing both questions concerning conflict of laws and separation of powers, Field recognized broad judicial deference on the matter of immigration and nationality law, holding that such laws were "conclusive upon the judiciary." In effect, Field left this area of law to popular sovereignty through Congress and the Presidency. This deference traces back to the Roman Empire and was embraced by Founding Fathers such as Gouverneur Morris during the debates over the Constitution. The precedent of this case was subsequently developed into the plenary power and consular nonreviewability doctrines of immigration and nationality law.

== Subsequent developments ==
=== Plenary power doctrine ===
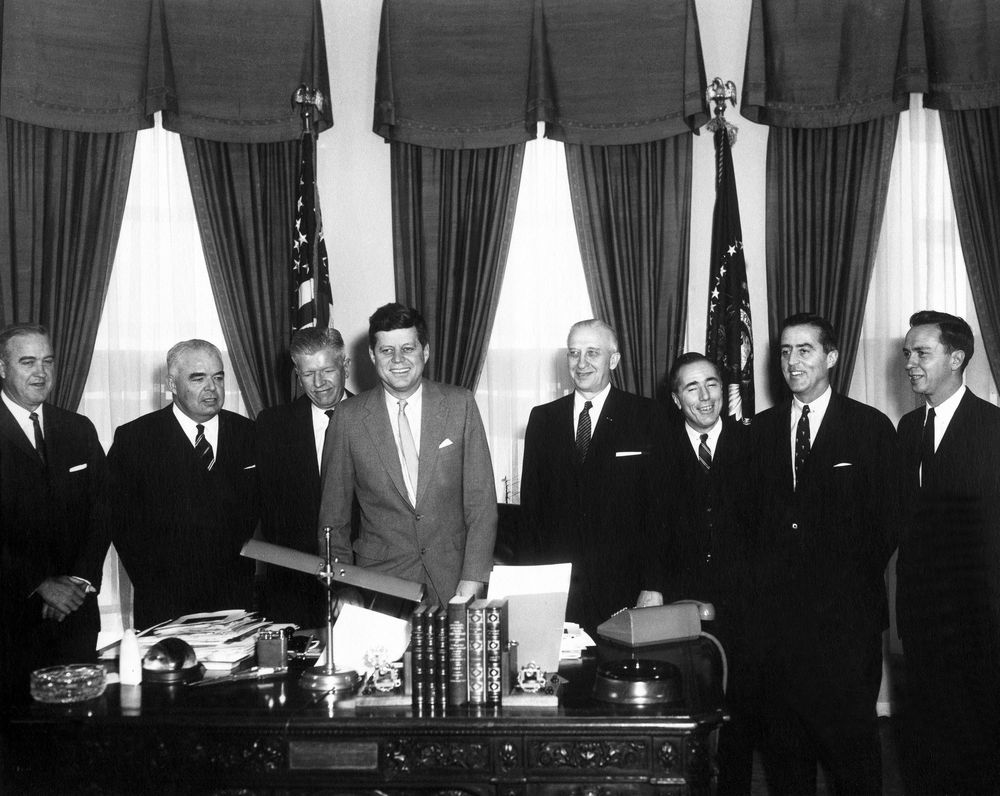
President Kennedy with his ambassadors in March 1961

The decision in Chae Chan Ping is a foundational legal precedent for the plenary power doctrine. This doctrine holds that Congress and the President have exclusive power over immigration and nationality law, so judicial review is limited. The result is "a domain where ordinary constitutional rules have never applied". Consular nonreviewability is a related doctrine that limits judicial review of consular affairs.

=== 19th century developments ===
The foundational precedent of Chae Chan Ping was further developed by Supreme Court decisions in the 1890s, including Nishimura Ekiu v. United States (1892) and Fong Yue Ting v. United States (1893). The decision in Nishimura Ekiu built upon Chae Chan Ping both by reaffirming the federal government's power to restrict immigration and by establishing that in judicial review of immigration and nationality law, the "decisions of executive or administrative officers, acting within powers expressly conferred by Congress, are due process of law". Fong Yue Ting held that removal is repatriation, not a punishment, and limited the constitutional applicability of jury trial rights, protections from unreasonable searches and seizures, and protections from cruel and unusual punishments in removal proceedings.

Lem Moon Sing v. United States (1895) and Wong Wing v. United States (1896) reinforced Nishimura Ekiu and Fong Yue Ting. Lem Moon Sing upheld legislation codifying the finality established in Nishimura Ekiu. Wong Wing reaffirmed Fong Yue Ting, but the court held that an otherwise "infamous" punishment imposed alongside removal was still bound by criminal procedure.

=== 20th century developments ===
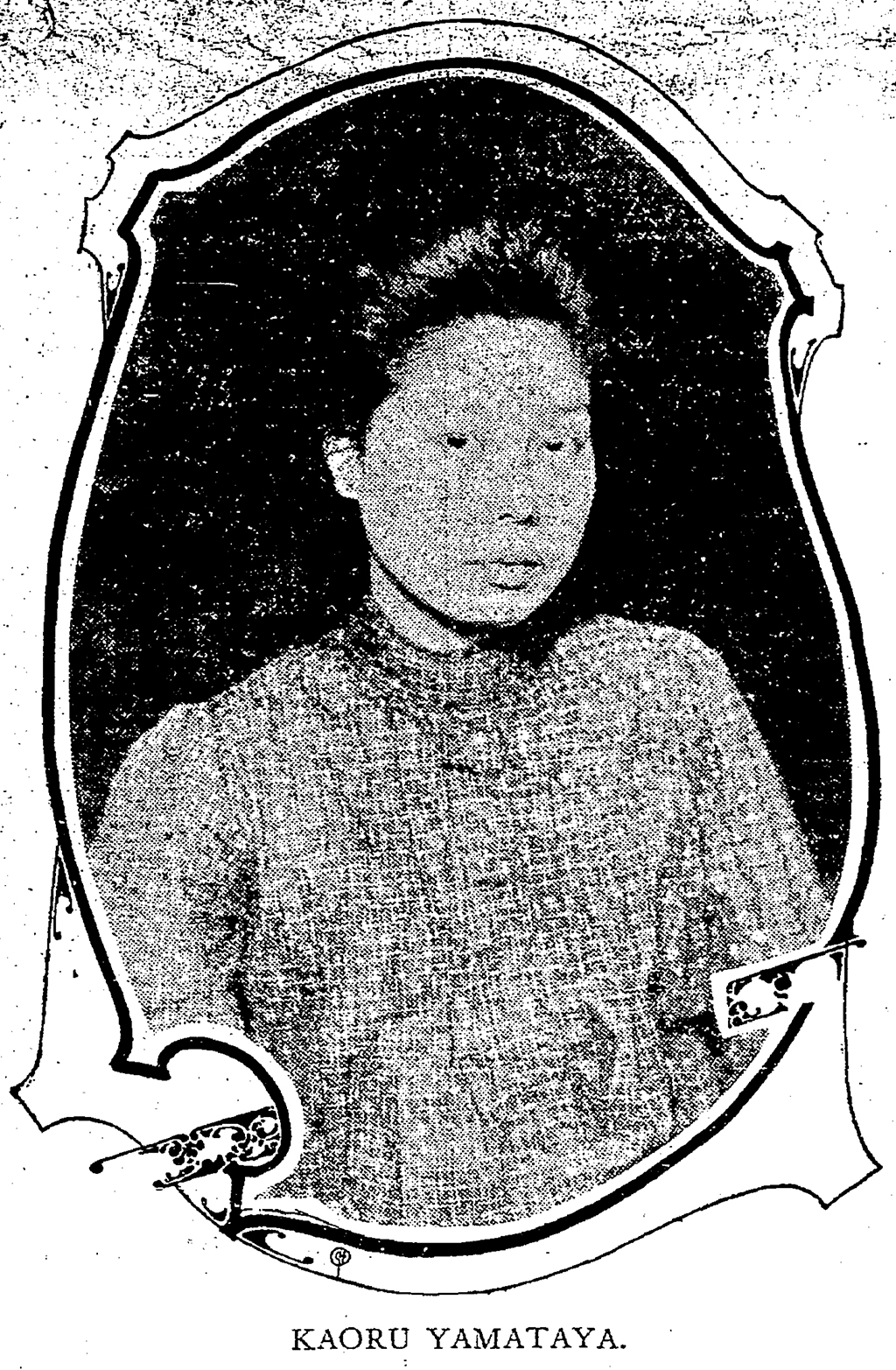
Kaoru Yamataya, c. 1906

At the start of the 20th century, the Supreme Court began moderating its interpretation of the plenary power doctrine, though it did not entirely abandon the doctrine. This shift appeared in Yamataya v. Fisher (1903), or the Japanese Immigrant Case, where the court reaffirmed earlier rulings while providing the first instance of judicial review of procedural due process challenges to removal proceedings.

The court expanded on this reasoning in United States ex rel. Turner v. Williams (1904), where John Turner challenged his exclusion under the Anarchist Exclusion Act. While the court entertained his procedural due process claim, it declined First Amendment review, relying on the plenary power doctrine. By the time of Oceanic Steam Navigation Co. v. Stranahan (1909), the doctrine had become firmly entrenched, with the court holding: "[O]ver no conceivable subject is the legislative power of Congress more complete."

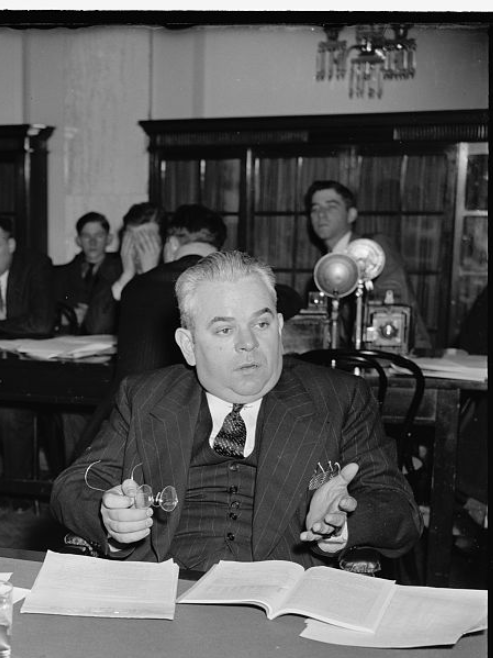
District Director Shaughnessy, c. 1939

The doctrine reached its fullest scope during the 1950s, through a series of three decisions espousing near-total deference to the political branches. First, the Supreme Court held in United States ex rel. Knauff v. Shaughnessy (1950) that immigration was a privilege, and reaffirmed Nishimura Ekiu, stating:

"Whatever the procedure authorized by Congress is, it is due process as far as an alien denied entry is concerned."

— United States ex rel. Knauff v. Shaughnessy, 338 U.S. at 544

Second, Harisiades v. Shaughnessy (1952) upheld the removal of nine people over their Communist Party USA membership by applying a highly deferential standard of review, stating that immigration and nationality law is "so exclusively entrusted to the political branches of government as to be largely immune from judicial inquiry or interference." Third, in Shaughnessy v. United States ex rel. Mezei (1953), the Supreme Court delivered its "strongest statement" of the plenary power doctrine, upheld a prolonged detention on Ellis Island, and reaffirmed Chae Chan Ping.

The court continued to apply the plenary power doctrine throughout the latter half of the 20th century. In Galvan v. Press (1954), it rejected a substantive due process challenge to the removal of a Mexican national who had lived in the United States for over thirty years, holding that "the slate is not clean" and that "there is not merely a page of history, but a whole volume." In Boutilier v. Immigration and Naturalization Service (1967), the court upheld the removal of a gay man, citing Chae Chan Ping in stating that "Congress has plenary power." In Kleindienst v. Mandel (1972), the court upheld the denial of a visa to a Marxist economist, stating that since Chae Chan Ping, "the general reaffirmations of this principle have been legion." In Fiallo v. Bell (1977), the court relied on the precedent set by Chae Chan Ping to reject an equal protection challenge to an immigration and nationality law favoring mothers over fathers of illegitimate children in visa sponsorship.

=== 21st century developments ===
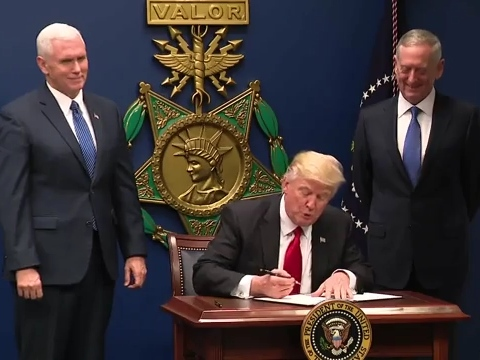
President Trump signing Executive Order 13769, a predecessor to Presidential Proclamation 9645

While Chae Chan Ping has been criticized for its discriminatory outcome, judicial deference in immigration and nationality law has continued into the 21st century. In Trump v. Hawaii (2018), Margo Schlanger called on the Supreme Court to "jettison" the doctrine. Contrary to that call, the court relied on the doctrine to uphold Presidential Proclamation 9645, issued by President Trump to bar admission from several Muslim-majority countries.

In Department of Homeland Security v. Thuraissigiam (2020), the court recited precedents from the 1891 to 1952 "finality era" to uphold the jurisdiction stripping provisions of the expedited removal system against a Suspension Clause challenge. In Department of State v. Muñoz (2024), the court upheld the denial of a spousal visa against a substantive due process challenge and reaffirmed plenary power doctrine precedents, including Knauff.

== See also ==
- List of United States Supreme Court cases, volume 130
- Immigration to the United States
