= Fiallo v. Bell =

- Supreme Court of the United States

Argued December 7, 1976 Decided April 26, 1977
- Full case name: Fiallo v. Bell
- Citations: 430 U.S. 787 (more)

Case history
- Prior: Appeal from the District Court of the United States for the Eastern District of New York

Holding
- Section 101(b)(1)(D) and 101(b)(2) of the Immigration and Nationality Act of 1952 are constitutional, even though they exclude the relationship between an illegitimate child and his natural father from the immigration preferences granted to the "child" or "parent" of a U.S. citizen or lawful permanent resident.

Court membership
- Chief Justice Warren E. Burger Associate Justices William J. Brennan Jr. · Potter Stewart; Byron White · Thurgood Marshall; Harry Blackmun · Lewis F. Powell Jr. William Rehnquist · John P. Stevens

Case opinions
- Majority: Powell, joined by Burger, Stewart, Blackmun, Rehnquist, Stevens
- Dissent: Marshall, joined by Brennan and White

Laws applied
- Immigration and Nationality Act of 1952

Fiallo v. Bell, 430 U.S. 787 (1977), was a U.S. Supreme Court case that challenged the constitutionality of Sections 101(b)(1)(D) and 101(b)(2) of the Immigration and Nationality Act of 1952. The Sections gave immigration preference to children or parents of either existing U.S. citizens or of noncitizens residing under lawful permanent resident status. But, as the Court wrote, the statute defined “child” narrowly: “an unmarried person under 21 years of age who is a legitimate or legitimated child, a stepchild, an adopted child, or an illegitimate child seeking preference by virtue of his relationship with his mother”.

The appellants, three sets of unmarried biological fathers, contended that the law was discriminatory to the relationship between natural fathers and their illegitimate child and claimed equal protection and due process violations.

The Supreme Court rejected the appellants’ claims and upheld the Sections, citing Congress' “exceptionally broad power” to admit or exclude non-citizens and acknowledging the intentional political choice of Congress to exclude a select group. As put by Justice Powell, who wrote for the majority, it was not, “the judicial role in cases of this sort to probe and test the justifications for the legislative decision.”

== Background ==
Ramon Fiallo was a United States born citizen, but resident of the Dominican Republic, whose mother petitioned, on his behalf, for his Dominican father to be legally declared his parent. The United States Consul in the Dominican Republic rejected Fiallo’s petition, citing his illegitimacy—his parents were not married nor would be in the future. Fiallo, along with appellant Cleophus Warner—a US citizen with an illegitimate child in the French West Indies—and appellants Trevor and Earl Wilson—permanent residents petitioning for their Jamaican father—sued Attorney General Edward H. Levi in the US District Court for the Eastern District of New York.

The District Court dismissed the suit, alluding to the plenary power of Congress over matters of admission and exclusion of non-residents.

In 1976, the Supreme Court noted probable jurisdiction and accepted the appeal.

== Argument ==
The appellants, represented by Harold R. Tyler Jr., put forth three key arguments against the identified Sections of the 1952 Act:

- The statutory exclusion predicated on a father’s marital status, his child’s illegitimacy, and the sex of the parent violated the appellants’ right to equal protection of the law.
- The inherent statutory assumption that there is a lack of familial tie (emotional, economic, or otherwise) between fathers and their illegitimate children violates the appellants’ right to due process of the law.
- The effect of the statute impairs the appellants’ right to “mutual association, to privacy, to establish a home, to raise natural children, and to be raised by natural fathers.”

== Decision ==
From the outset of the decision, the Court emphasized the “limited scope of judicial inquiry into immigration legislation”, citing Shaughnessy v. Mezei which recognized Congressional power to expel or exclude aliens as “a fundamental sovereign attribute”, and more recent cases from the 1970s consistent with Mathews v. Diaz.

Appellants did not challenge the practice of judicial deference to congressional immigration policy decisions. The appellants asserted a violation of equal protection, referencing previous border search cases (Almeida-Sanchez v. United States and United States v. Brignoni-Ponce) for their argument that the judiciary must scrutinize immigration legislation to protect the rights of citizens. The Court, however, found that these precedents did not limit Congress' authority to make classifications for regulating alien entrance, and refused to apply the principle.

The Court was similarly unconvinced with the appellants’ attempt to apply stricter judicial scrutiny by claiming the discrimination within the statute (i.e., based on sex and illegitimacy) infringed on rights of citizens to familial relationships and denied due process. The Court cited its prior holding in the First Amendment case Kleindienst v. Mandel, in which the Court refused to apply the strict scrutiny standard to ensure the executive branch had acted within its bounds to deny immigration. To Fiallo, therefore, the Court applied the same judicial standard it had when a first amendment right was in question.

Finally, given that the 1952 Act was amended in 1957 specifically to add illegitimate children and their mothers, the Court recognized that the omission of illegitimate children and their fathers was an “intentional choice” on the part of Congress. The Court, therefore, asserted that it was not its role to “probe” and “test” the reasons for Congress’ legislative actions.

On April 26, 1977, the Supreme Court ruled against appellants Fiallo, Warner, and Wilson in a 6-3 majority with Justices Marshall, Brennan, and White dissenting. Justice Marshall was alone in writing a dissenting opinion.

== Justice Marshall's Dissent ==
Justice Marshall asserted that Fifth Amendment rights are still applicable to immigration law and reasons that the mere involvement of immigration should not result in an immediate deferral to Congress under the rationale of plenary power:

Until today I thought it clear that when Congress grants benefits to some citizens, but not to others, it is our duty to insure that the decision comports with Fifth Amendment principles of due process and equal protection. Today, however, the Court appears to hold that discrimination among citizens, however invidious and irrational, must be tolerated if it occurs in the context of the immigration laws. Since I cannot agree that Congress has license to deny fundamental rights to citizens according to the most disfavored criteria simply because the Immigration and Nationality Act is involved, I dissent.

He also noted that the case “directly involves the rights of citizens, not aliens.” Accordingly, because Fifth Amendment rights are pertinent to immigration and because citizens’ rights are involved, Marshall agreed with the appellants’ contention that the Sections violated equal protection and due process rights.

Justice Marshall also parted with the majority in asserting that the case should have been held to a higher form of judicial scrutiny, reasoning that “freedom of personal choice in matters of marriage and family life” is a fundamental right and is grounds for strict scrutiny.

== Legacy ==
The Fiallo Court, in asserting that “over no conceivable subject is the legislative power of Congress more complete than it is over the admission of aliens”, built upon the precedent set by cases like Chae Chan Ping v. United States and Fong Yue Ting v. United States in establishing judicial deference and Congressional plenary power in the realm of immigration. Because Fiallo involved the rights of US citizens (i.e., the right to personal choice in family matters), the Court’s decision established Congressional power to legislate immigration policy that affects citizens.

In 1999, as part of Chapter 12 of Title 8 of the United States Code, Congress enacted legislation reversing the Sections of the 1952 Act challenged in Fiallo. Fathers can now petition for their illegitimate child’s permanent residence, if they can prove a “bona fide parent-child relationship.” No such burden of proof is put on mothers.
