= In re Ah Lung =

1883 federal case in the United States

- Court: United States Circuit Court for the Northern District of California
- Full case name: In re Ah Lung
- Decided: September 24, 1883
- Citation: 18 F. 28

Holding
- Denied release of petitioner from detention

Court membership
- Judges sitting: Stephen Johnson Field, Lorenzo Sawyer

Laws applied
- Chinese Exclusion Act

In re Ah Lung, 18 F. 28 (D.Cal. 1883), was a case decided by the United States Circuit Court for the Northern District of California on September 24, 1883, that challenged detention pursuant to the Chinese Exclusion Act.

Before the Court was the issue of whether the Chinese Exclusion Act's immigration restriction applied to a British subject born in Hong Kong.The Court ruled that "Chinese laborers" extended to encompass "all Chinese laborers, without regard to the country of which they may be subjects."

== Background ==
In 1848, following the annexation of California, the State experienced an influx of immigration after the discovery of gold in Sutter's Mill. Although most gold miners came from the United States' eastern states, Chinese miners also moved to partake in the rush. Many Chinese migrants arrived as contract laborers in pursuit of gold, a journey known as "Gold Mountain" (Cantonese: Gāmsāan, 金山), seeking improved economic prospects compared to those present in China at that time.

As gold became scarcer, Chinese immigrants settled in urban areas and filled low-wage positions, such as field laborers and laundromat operators. Nativist calls to exclude Chinese immigrants increased. In response, the California legislature passed laws concerning Chinese immigrants, including the Foreign Miners' License Tax Act of 1852 and An Act to Discourage the Immigration to this State of Persons Who Cannot Become Citizens Thereof. The former imposed a monthly-collected fee on foreign miners, while the latter applied a landing tax that charged shipowners for each passenger who was a foreigner.

=== Federal law ===
In 1875, the Burlingame Treaty's guarantee of immigration expired and was followed by the Page Act of 1875, which restricted the admission of female prostitutes from China, forced laborers from China, and felons from anywhere in the world. Then, the Angell Treaty of 1880, as a modification to Burlingame, permitted Congress to restrict specifically Chinese immigration into the United States.

The Chinese Exclusion Act broadly prohibited admission of Chinese persons into the United States. The Act also grandfathered previously admitted Chinese immigrants. Section 14 barred the naturalization of Chinese persons.

== Facts ==
Jung Ah Lung, a Chinese-ethnic person, was born in British Hong Kong. At the time, China had partially ceded Hong Kong to the British through the 1842 Treaty of Nanking.

In the 1880s, Ah Lung immigrated to the United States as a laborer. After his ship landed in San Francisco Bay, Ah Lung was denied admission into the United States and detained aboard the steamship Oceanic. Following his denial of admission, Ah Lung petitioned for a writ of habeas corpus and sought release from his detention.

== Decision ==
On September 24, 1883, the United States Circuit Court for the Northern District of California issued its decision to deny release of Ah Lung from detention. Justice Stephen Johnson Field authored the decision while "riding" the now-abolished circuit courts.

Ah Lung argued he was a British subject of Hong Kong, not a Chinese subject, and thus was being unlawfully detained under the Chinese Exclusion Act. Justice Field disagreed, he reasoned that the Chinese Exclusion's Act legislative intent was to prohibit more than merely "subjects of China" and was to extend to general immigration of Chinese-ethnic laborers. Field noted that the Burlingame Treaty used "citizens or subjects of foreign Powers," while its 1880 modification referenced "the immigration of Chinese."

Since Ah Lung was a British subject, he further argued his detention could conflict with treaties between the United States and Britain. Justice Field disagreed, reasoning that Britain could object by filing a diplomatic complaint to the executive branch.

Drawing context from within the Act itself, Field found "Chinese laborer" adequately encompassed both every Chinese laborer and person. First, Field highlighted that the Act made it a misdemeanor for vessel owners to bring "any Chinese laborer, from any foreign port or place." Second, the Act mandated removal of "any Chinese person found unlawfully within the United States...to the country from whence he came."

Therefore, the Court concluded that the Act's immigration restriction applied to all Chinese laborers, regardless of their country of departure. Ah Lung was ordered to "return[] to the ship from which he was taken."

== Impact ==
In 1884, Congress amended the Chinese Exclusion Act, changing the "Chinese laborer" language to "all persons of the Chinese race," thus codifying the Ah Lung decision. It is believed that the circuit split between courts for cases such as Ah Lung and other courts, such as Massachusetts' in United States v. Douglas, 17 F. 634, was the reason for the amendments. Ah Lung interpreted the Chinese Exclusion Act through an ethnic focus on Chinese people while Douglas focused on Chinese nationality. Nikolas Bowie, argued that Justice Field's decision reflected his personal views and concerns about Chinese migrants.

== Relationship to other cases ==
- Head Money Cases, 112 U.S. 580 (1884): This case involved an open-immigration treaty that conflicted with Congress's measures to reduce immigration, in that case, a treaty between Russia and the United States, wherein the Supreme Court upheld the Immigration Act of 1882, citing Ah Lung to support the ability of Congress to abrogate treaties.
- Chae Chan Ping v. United States, 130 U.S. 581 (1889): This case involved an extension to the Chinese Exclusion Act that prohibited the reentry of outbound Chinese immigrants, wherein the Supreme Court upheld the Scott Act of 1888.

== See also ==
- List of Chinese Exclusion cases
