= Shaughnessy v. United States ex rel. Mezei =

1953 U.S. Supreme Court Case

- Supreme Court of the United States

Argued January 7–8, 1953 Decided March 16, 1953
- Full case name: Shaughnessy v. United States ex rel. Mezei
- Citations: 345 U.S. 206 (more)

Case history
- Prior: 195 F.2d 964

Holding
- The Attorney General's continued exclusion of the alien without a hearing does not amount to an unlawful detention, and courts may not temporarily admit him to the United States pending arrangements for his departure.

Court membership
- Chief Justice Fred M. Vinson Associate Justices Hugo Black · Stanley F. Reed; Felix Frankfurter · William O. Douglas; Robert H. Jackson · Harold H. Burton; Tom C. Clark · Sherman Minton

Case opinions
- Majority: Clark, joined by Vinson, Reed, Burton, Minton
- Dissent: Black, joined by Douglas
- Dissent: Jackson, joined by Frankfurter

Shaughnessy v. United States ex rel. Mezei, 345 U.S. 206 (1953), is a landmark decision of the Supreme Court of the United States that upheld the prolonged immigration detention of a foreigner who, on confidential information and without a hearing, was denied admission to the United States.

The decision arose concerning Ignatz Mezei, a Gibraltarian-born man of Hungarian-Romanian descent, who had "entered the United States illegally but lived quietly in Buffalo until leaving to visit his dying mother in Romania." On his return, he was dubbed "the man without a country" due to the difficulties that the government faced in locating a country to remove Mezei to after he was denied admission to the United States.

Shaughnessy v. United States ex rel. Mezei is viewed as the "strongest statement" of the plenary power doctrine in immigration and nationality case law, and at the time, was said to “render[] obsolete every habeas corpus case in the books” about the admission of foreigners to the United States.

== Background ==
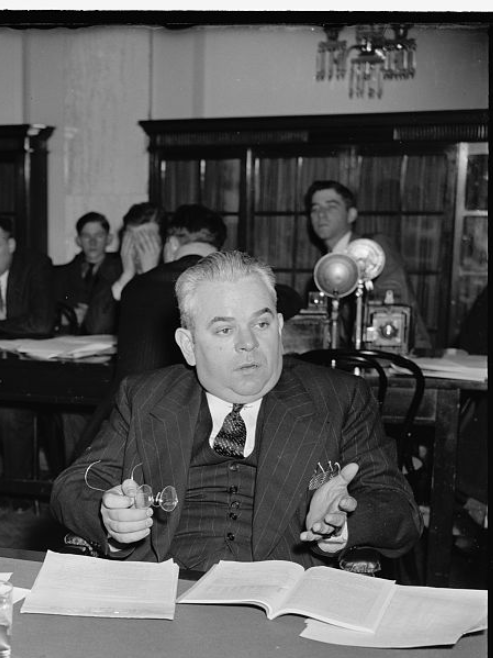
District Director Shaughnessy, c. 1939

Ignatz Mezei was born in Gibraltar of Hungarian and Romanian descent, had unlawfully arrived in the United States in 1923, and lived in Buffalo, New York for 25 years. In 1948, Ignatz Mezei left his wife, four stepchildren, and a carpenter job to visit his dying mother in Romania. Upon his arrival in Romania, Mezei found he would not be able to enter and he thereafter decided to attempt to return to the United States. After spending 19 months in Europe, Mezei was able to secure an immigration quota visa from the American Consulate in Budapest, Hungary; he then returned to the U.S. aboard a ship bound for Ellis Island. On February 9, 1950, Ignatz Mezei’s ship arrived in New York where Mezei was informed by Edward J. Shaughnessy, the INS District Director for New York, that he was inadmissible. While the precise grounds and factual basis for this denial of admission were unknown to Mezei, he was aware that the IRS had once looked into him for possible ties to the Hungarian lodge of the International Workers Order. Prior to his removal hearing, Mezei’s attorney, Jack Wasserman, met with a Justice Department official who presented that the denial of admission arose based on three grounds:

1. That Mezei was a member of the Communist Party at some point during 1929–1945. Mezei served as President and Secretary of the International Workers Order's Hungarian lodge in Buffalo, New York;
2. that Mezei was convicted of a crime involving moral turpitude (petty larceny in 1935); and
3. that the statements he provided to consular officers in Hungary to obtain an immigrant quota visa were materially false, fictitious, or fraudulent.

Mezei himself was not presented with this information. Mezei was detained for two years at Ellis Island on order of the Attorney General, which was Herbert Brownell Jr. by the time that the case was decided at the Supreme Court, before filing for habeas corpus to contest his detention. United States District Judge Irving Kauffman, for the Southern District of New York, held that Mezei was to be released on bond and the Court of Appeals for the Second Circuit affirmed. The Supreme Court later granted certiorari.

== Opinion of the Court ==
Justice Clark reaffirmed governmental power to bar the admission of foreigners into the United States, holding it is a "fundamental sovereign attribute exercised by the Government’s political departments largely immune from judicial control", citing Chae Chan Ping v. United States (1889), Fong Yue Ting v. United States (1893), United States ex rel. Knauff v. Shaughnessy (1950) and Harisiades v. Shaughnessey (1952). Mezei was denied admission pursuant to the Passport Act of 1918. This law authorized restrictions on foreign admission to and departure from the United States during periods of international tension. The court held the Attorney General properly used that authority when denying entry to Mezei based on United States involvement in the Cold War. The court further held that Mezei did not accrue any right to lawful admission during the time he had lived in New York. Therefore, the court held the admissibility status of Mezei was "assimilated" to that of a newly arrived foreigner for constitutional purposes.

Due to the court finding that Ignatz Mezei's admission into the United States would be prejudicial to the public interest, the legality of his detention on Ellis Island was at issue. There, the court held that his detention on Ellis Island was no different legally than if he was detained at the border outside a port of entry; thus, he could be expeditiously removed from Ellis Island without a hearing. In this final holding, the Court stated that Mezei's detention on Ellis Island did not deprive him of any cognizable right.

=== Dissents ===
In the five to four decision, four Justices joined the dissenting opinion. Justice Black, with whom Justice Douglas concurred, stated that Ignatz Mezei's continued detention without a hearing violated due process. In this case, due process had been violated because "neither the federal police nor the federal prosecutors nor any other governmental official, whatever his title, can put or keep people in prison without accountability to courts of justice". Therefore, the dissenters stated that Mezei had been deprived of his liberty due to his detention occurring outside of judicial proceedings.

The final two dissenters, Justice Jackson joined by Justice Frankfurter, further expanded the concerns stated in the other dissenting opinion. The federal government stated that Mezei was not deprived of due process because his intermittent departure to a third-country was an available alternative to detention pending a final decision on admissibility. The dissenter's response was, "That might mean freedom, if only he were an amphibian!" In their opinion, Mezei was unjustly detained. Justice Jackson and Justice Frankfurter then clarified that not all detention pending removal would amount to a deprivation of due process. Rather, the dissenters stated their opinion that detention without notice or an opportunity for a hearing was contrary to due process.

== Aftermath ==
On August 11, 1954, after the US had failed to find a country willing to accept his deportation, and as the Eisenhower administration was preparing to close Ellis Island, Mezei was released on parole and returned home to his wife and stepchildren in Buffalo. After his wife died in 1969, he sold their home and returned to Hungary, where he died in the 1970s "largely forgotten".
