= Nishimura Ekiu v. United States =

- Supreme Court of the United States

Argued December 16, 1891 Decided January 18, 1892
- Full case name: Nishimura Ekiu v. United States
- Citations: 142 U.S. 651 (more) 12 S. Ct. 336; 35 L. Ed. 1146

Case history
- Prior: Appeal from the Circuit Court of the United States for the Northern District of California

Holding
- The Immigration Act of 1891 is valid; in immigration and nationality law, due process for a foreigner seeking admission is limited to the procedures provided by statute, and unless Congress provides otherwise, an administrative decision on admissibility is final.

Court membership
- Chief Justice Melville Fuller Associate Justices Stephen J. Field · Joseph P. Bradley; John M. Harlan · Horace Gray; Samuel Blatchford · Lucius Q. C. Lamar II; David J. Brewer · Henry B. Brown

Case opinions
- Majority: Gray, joined by Fuller, Field, Bradley, Harlan, Blatchford, Lamar, Brown
- Dissent: Brewer

Laws applied
- U.S. Const. amend. V; Immigration Act of 1891

Nishimura Ekiu v. United States, 142 U.S. 651 (1892), is a landmark decision of the Supreme Court of the United States that upheld the constitutionality of a provision in the Immigration Act of 1891, a follow-up to the Immigration Act of 1882. The Immigration Act of 1891 further federalized immigration and nationality law, expanded immigration inspection, and established the Office of Superintendent of Immigration.

The case arose concerning Nishimura Ekiu, a Japanese woman who came to the United States at the port of San Francisco, where she was then denied admission as a public charge. Ekiu subsequently sought judicial review of her admission denial, but section 8 of the Immigration Act of 1891, upheld in the case, provided for the administrative finality of these admissibility decisions.

The case is viewed as the judicial beginning of the 1891 to 1952 "finality era", and is further significant for establishing that in judicial review of immigration and nationality law, the "decisions of executive or administrative officers, acting within powers expressly conferred by Congress, are due process of law".

== Background ==
=== Backdrop of laws ===
The Page Act of 1875 forbade the immigration of prostitutes and forced laborers from Asia, requiring Asian women to obtain certificates of character from Hong Kong prior to migrating.

The Angell Treaty of 1880 temporarily banned migration from China, and the Chinese Exclusion Act of 1882 extended the ban on migration of laborers for ten years. Around the same time as the Chinese Exclusion Act, the Immigration Act of 1882 was passed. This law set the basic framework for immigration enforcement at sea ports.

The Scott Act of 1888 forbade Chinese migrants from re-entering the United States. This Act was challenged in Chae Chan Ping v. United States (1889), but the United States Supreme Court ruled against the litigant and upheld the law.

=== Immigration Act of 1891 ===
The Immigration Act of 1891 focused on the situation of migrants from countries other than China. The Act's key pieces included:

- Additional classes of excludable aliens
- New border procedures and extended authority to land borders: The Act specified that the officers in charge of any vessel arriving by sea had to submit a list of passengers with their biographical information to the immigration inspectors at the port. Requirements of this sort had been part of United States federal law since the requirement for a manifest of immigrants in Section 4 of the Steerage Act of 1819. However, in this case the list needed to be submitted immediately upon arrival and was used to inspect aliens prior to admitting them. The inspectors at ports of entry had the authority to conduct a medical examination of aliens suspected of being unfit or having dangerous diseases, marking the beginning of medical exclusion of immigrants in the United States. Aliens who were detained for a medical examination were still considered to not have formally entered the United States.
- New bureaucratic office to coordinate immigration enforcement
- Authority to deport
- Penalties and restrictions on abetting migration

Of these provisions, it was the new border procedures that would be effectively challenged by the case.

== The case ==
=== Initial detention by California immigration commissioner and habeas corpus petition ===
The case involved Nishimura Ekiu, a 25-year-old female citizen of Japan who arrived on the steamship Belgic from Yokohama, Japan on May 7, 1891. William H. Thornley, commissioner of immigration of the state of California, refused to allow her and five other passengers to land. In a report on May 13, 1891, he elaborated on the reason for denying her entry: "Passport states that she comes to San Francisco in company with her husband, which is not a fact. She states that she has been married two years, and that her husband has been in the United States one year, but she does not know his address. She has $22, and is to stop at some hotel until her husband calls for her." Rather than detaining her on the ship, he decided to detain her at the Methodist Episcopal Japanese and Chinese Mission, a location he deemed more suitable for her to stay, until the date the ship would sail back. His report cited the Immigration Act of 1882. The collector approved Thornley's decision. On the same day (May 13), a writ of habeas corpus was issued to Thornley to produce Ekiu. Thornley replied explaining where he had detained her and said he would continue to detain her there until final disposition of the writ.

=== Re-examination and rejection of habeas corpus by an immigration inspector ===
On May 14, 1891, the secretary of the treasury appointed John L. Hatch, an immigration inspector at the port of San Francisco, to re-examine the case. On May 16, Hatch submitted a report almost identical to that submitted originally by Thornley, except that he also cited the Immigration Act of 1891 in support of the decision. On May 18, Hatch intervened in opposition of the writ of habeas corpus, noting that based on his investigation, Ekiu was 'an alien immigrant from Yokohama, empire of Japan,' and 'a person without means of support, without relatives or friends in the United States,' and "a person unable to care for herself, and liable to become a public charge, and therefore inhibited from landing under the provisions of said act of 1891, and previous acts of which said act is amendatory."

=== Challenge and loss in the circuit court ===
At the hearing before the commissioner of the circuit court, the petitioner offered to introduce evidence as to her right to land; and contended that if the Immigration Act of 1891 allowed immigration bureaucrats to make final decisions on such matters without the possibility of judicial review, it was unconstitutional.

The commissioner excluded the evidence offered as to the petitioner's right to land, noting that the question of that right had been tried and determined by a duly-constituted and competent tribunal having jurisdiction in the premises. Therefore, the court rejected the habeas corpus petition on July 24, 1891.

=== Supreme Court case ===
The appellant, Nishimura Ekiu, then appealed to the United States Supreme Court. The case was heard before the Supreme Court, with Lyman I. Mowry representing the appellant and Assistant Attorney General Packet representing the United States.

The court ruled against the appellant. The court agreed with the appellant that an appellant had the right to challenge, with a writ of habeas corpus, any unlawful detention. For this, it cited Chew Heong v. United States, United States v. Jung Ah Lung, and Wan Shing v. United States as precedents.

However, the court sided with the United States government on the position that the final determination of facts of the case (specifically, whether the appellant had relatives in the United States, and whether she would be able to support herself financially) was to be made according to the rule provided by Cp

A number of precedents, including in domains unrelated to immigration, were cited, such as Martin v. Mott (deference to the President ordering militias into service), Railroad Co. v. Stimpson (a patent dispute where the Supreme Court held that its goal was simply to determine whether the patent office properly handled the case, rather than re-evaluate the case fully on merits), Benson v. McMahon (deference to authorities regarding extradition procedure for crimes), In re Luis Oteiza y Cortes (the Court refused to discharge an officer for complying with an extradition request), and others.

The court held that the decision to refuse entry was generally not reviewable by courts:

It is not within the province of the judiciary to order that foreigners who have never been naturalized, nor acquired any domicil or residence within the United States, nor even been admitted to the country pursuant to law, shall be permitted to enter, in opposition to the constitutional and lawful measures of the legislative and executive branches of the national government. As to such persons, the decisions of executive or administrative officers, acting within powers expressly conferred by Congress, are due process of law.

The Head Money Cases had upheld the immigration Act of August 3, 1882 empowering the Secretary of the Treasury "to make contracts with any state commission, board or officers" to inspect and deny entry to "any convict, lunatic, idiot or ... public charge" as required by the immigration laws of the United States. The Court did not express an opinion on Thornley's authority as the state commissioner of immigration, as there was some uncertainty whether the provisions authorizing state commissions had been repealed. Rather, the court was satisfied that Hatch's appointment by the Secretary of Treasury as inspector of immigration was allowed by the Appointments Clause. It also noted that habeas corpus was simply a means to determine whether somebody could be held in custody, rather than a way to recover damages for unlawful arrest. The court argued that Hatch's appointment and his testimony were valid, and therefore ruled against the appellant.

=== Dissent ===
Justice Brewer dissented from the majority opinion.

== Relation with other court cases ==
=== Relation with the second Japanese immigrant case ===
A later case, Yamataya v. Fisher (1903), bears many similarities with Nishimura Ekiu v. United States. Both cases involved a female Japanese citizen who challenged immigration authorities' decision to let her into the United States, and both sought to challenge the Immigration Act of 1891 that the denial was based on. In both cases, the court ruled against the appellant and declined to consider the specific facts surrounding the appellant's admissibility into the United States. In both cases, the appellant was ultimately deported.

However, the two cases differ in terms of the precedent they set. Whereas Nishimura Ekiu is seen as a complete refusal by the court to consider the appellant's claim, the court did acknowledge the appellant's rights to due process in Yamataya v. Fisher. The court in Yamataya v. Fisher argued that the appeals process within the immigration bureaucracy was sufficient to meet the due process requirements, and the appellant's rights were not violated. However, the very fact that the court opined on the issue set a precedent for future challenges based on procedural due process violations.

=== Value as a precedent for later doctrines in immigration law ===
The case, along with Chae Chan Ping v. United States and Fong Yue Ting v. United States, has been cited as one of the precedents for Supreme Court deference to the plenary power doctrine for immigration law, and the related doctrine of consular nonreviewability. However, the court's more cautious response in Nishimura Ekiu v. United States than in Chae Chan Ping v. United States set a precedent in practice of a greater burden of proof for deportation than for exclusion cases.

In the case and most of the Chinese Exclusion Cases, the Supreme Court repeatedly sided with the United States government and against aliens, offering the rationale that immigration policy and its enforcement were a matter for the legislative and executive branches. Some commentators argue that these cases were key precedents for establishing the plenary power doctrine, whereas others have disagreed about the significance of these cases for plenary power. The defining case for the plenary power doctrine, Knauff v. Shaughnessy (1950) did not explicitly cite the case.
