= Consular nonreviewability =

Doctrine in US immigration law

Consular nonreviewability (sometimes written as consular non-reviewability, and also called consular absolutism) refers to the common law doctrine in United States immigration and nationality law whereby the visa decisions made by United States consular officers working for the United States Department of State are presumed to be not subject to judicial review.

It is closely related to the plenary power doctrine that immunizes from judicial review the substance of United States immigration and nationality law.

== Distinction between Department of State decisions, USCIS decisions, and ICE/CBP immigration enforcement decisions ==
Consular nonreviewability specifically applies to decisions made by consular officers representing the United States in other countries, who are employees of the United States Department of State. It does not apply to decisions made by United States Citizenship and Immigration Services.

For many immigrant and non-immigrant visas, the approval of a petition or application from the USCIS is a prerequisite for obtaining the visa. However, the visa may be denied despite the USCIS application having been approved, and consular nonreviewability insulates such decisions from challenge. For instance, in the case of Kerry v. Din (2015) the applicant whose visa was denied had gotten USCIS approval through a Form I-130 filed by his wife, but his visa was nonetheless denied and the United States government claimed that detailed explanation of the reason of denial was not necessary.

Consular nonreviewability also does not apply to decisions made by U.S. Customs and Border Protection officers when deciding whether to allow an alien to enter or not enter the United States at a designated port of entry, or to immigration enforcement actions taken by U.S. Immigration and Customs Enforcement. However, in practice, the avenues of legal redress for the actions of these agencies are limited, owing to the plenary power doctrine.

== Review and reconsideration within the Department of State ==
Consular nonreviewability does not mean that the Department of State cannot reconsider its immigration decisions. There are a number of avenues for redress within the Department of State for somebody whose visa is denied.

=== Re-application and submission of additional information ===
- Section 214(b) refusals: These are refusals for non-immigrant visas where the consular officer is unconvinced of the applicant's non-immigrant intent. This ground of refusal cannot be challenged in court, but the applicant is free to apply again for a visa (paying the visa fee again). Past refusals are on the record and the applicant is therefore in principle expected to show a change in circumstances to explain why he/she would now qualify for a visa. However, since different consular officers make decisions based on their own discretion the applicant may well qualify when applying the second time despite no change to circumstances.
- Section 221(g) refusals: These "quasi-refusals" mean that the consular officer has deferred a final decision on the applicant, and will complete the decision once additional information from the applicant or the United States government becomes available. If the pending information needs to come from the applicant, there is a time limit of one year. If the applicant exceeds the time limit, the applicant needs to re-apply. If the pending information needs to come from the United States government, there is no time limit. The various grounds for such quasi-refusals:
  - Suspension of Action on Petition
  - Addition evidence is required
  - Withdrawal of application (while it is pending adjudication)

=== Supervisorial review ===
The Code of Federal Regulations states that all non-immigrant visa denials should be reviewed by a supervisor. However, the Foreign Affairs Manual states that as many refusals as practical, but not fewer than 10%, should be reviewed, as soon as possible, but deferrable by up to 120 days if the applicant wishes to submit additional evidence. For immigrant visa applications, the review must take place as soon as administratively feasible (but within 30 days) unless the applicant wishes to submit additional evidence (in which case there is no time limit). Supervisorial review of 214(b) refusals (failure to establish non-immigrant intent) require the supervisor to re-interview the applicant.

== Scope and exceptions ==
A few exceptions to the doctrine of consular nonreviewability have emerged over the years:

1. The Mandel test, namely, that the consulate did not provide a "facially legitimate and bona fide" reason for the rejection, and it might infringe on the constitutional rights of United States citizens.
2. In cases where a consular officer rejects the application based on an underlying statute or regulation, it may sometimes be challenged in court on these two grounds:
  - Claims that the underlying statute or regulation being applied is unconstitutional.
  - Claims that the consular officer made a procedural error in applying the statute.

== History ==
=== Nishimura Ekiu (1892) and the "Finality Era" ===
The history of consular nonreviewability dates back to 1892, with Nishimura Ekiu v. United States, which arose concerning the denial of admission to a Japanese woman, on the grounds she was a public charge. Ekiu sought judicial review of her denial, but section 8 of the Immigration Act of 1891, provided for the finality of these decisions. The Supreme Court upheld that provision, which read:

...All decisions made by the inspection officers or their assistants touching the right of any alien to land, when adverse to such right, shall be final unless appeal be taken to the superintendent of immigration, whose action shall be subject to review by the Secretary of the Treasury...

— Section 8 of the Immigration Act of 1891

Thus, Nishimura Ekiu extended the deference afforded under the plenary power doctrine in United States immigration and nationality law to executive officers, though in a more narrow manner than the contemporary scope of consular nonreviewability. In the 1920s, the United States courts of appeals began to develop their own jurisprudence on consular nonreviewability, with the seminal cases being London v. Phelps (1927), decided by the 2nd Circuit, and Ulrich v. Kellogg (1929), decided by the D.C. Circuit.

=== United States ex rel. Knauff v. Shaughnessy (1950) ===
The "Finality Era" in United States immigration and nationality law would last from 1891 to 1952, ending with the Immigration and Nationality Act of 1952, as later recognized by the Supreme Court in Shaughnessy v. Pedreiro (1955), which held that broader judicial review existed for removal or admission decisions beyond just habeas corpus. Around the same time that finality began to end though, the Supreme Court would expand consular nonreviewability in United States ex rel. Knauff v. Shaughnessy (1950), a case where war bride Ellen Knauff challenged her denial of admission to the United States, but was unsuccessful, as the Supreme Court held that: "Whatever the procedure authorized by Congress is, it is due process as far as an alien denied entry is concerned." Further, the Supreme Court upheld her denial on the basis of secret evidence, holding that: "[I]t is not within the province of any court, unless expressly authorized by law, to review the determination...to exclude a given alien."

=== Kleindienst v. Mandel (1972) ===
Kleindienst v. Mandel, 408 U.S 753 (1972), was a United States Supreme Court decision that upheld that the United States Attorney General has the right to refuse somebody's entry to the United States, as he has been empowered to do so in 212 (a) (28) of the Immigration and Nationality Act of 1952.

This action was brought to compel Attorney General Kleindienst to grant a temporary nonimmigrant visa to a Belgian journalist and Marxian theoretician whom the American plaintiff-appellees, Ernest Mandel et al., had invited to participate in academic conferences and discussions in the US. The alien had been found ineligible for admission under 212 (a) (28) (D) and (G) (v) of the Immigration and Nationality Act of 1952, barring those who advocate or publish "the economic, international, and governmental doctrines of world communism." Kleindienst had declined to waive ineligibility as he has the power to do under 212 (d) of the Act, basing his decision on unscheduled activities engaged in by the alien on a previous visit to the United States, when a waiver was granted.

Even though it upheld consular nonreviewability, the opinion offered in the Kleindienst v. Mandel case paved the way for potential challenges to consular decisions. Specifically, Kleindienst v. Mandel rejected judicial review because it ruled that the consulate had offered a "bona fide and facially legitimate" reason for rejecting the visa. This suggested that in cases where such a reason was not provided, the consular decision may be subject to judicial review. This criterion for whether a consular decision might be eligible for judicial review would come to be known as the Mandel test.

=== Kerry v. Din (2015) ===
Kerry v. Din, 576 U.S. 86 (2015), was a United States Supreme Court decision that upheld the doctrine of consular nonreviewability. The case was filed by Fauzia Din, a United States citizen who had arrived in the country as a refugee from Afghanistan in 2000. In September 2006, she married Kanishka Berashk, a citizen of Afghanistan, who had worked as a civil servant under the Taliban regime. Din then submitted a Form I-130 petition to the United States Citizenship and Immigration Services, sponsoring Berashk under the Immediate Relative category. The petition was approved by the USCIS.

Berashk used the approved Form I-130 to apply for a visa to enter the United States. However, in June 2009, he was informed that his visa was denied; the stated reason for the denial was that he had provided material support to a terrorist but no further details were provided. Din filed suit in the United States District Court for the Northern District of California arguing that the government denied her due process of law by depriving her of her "constitutional right to live in the United States with her spouse." The District Court rejected her argument, but the Ninth Circuit Court of Appeals reversed. The United States appealed the reversal in the Supreme Court. Per the Mandel test, there were two questions at hand:

1. Was a constitutional right of Fauzia Din, a United States citizen, infringed upon?
2. Was the reason offered by the consulate for rejecting Berashk's visa "bona fide and facially legitimate" per Mandel?

The case was won by the United States, with the Supreme Court split in its opinion. Antonin Scalia, John G. Roberts, and Clarence Thomas wrote plurality opinions. Anthony Kennedy and Samuel Alito concurred.

Scalia's opinion rejected (1), i.e., he argued that the denial of a visa did not implicate a fundamental liberty interest, and that it differed from Loving v. Virginia in that the right to marriage was not being questioned. Kennedy's opinion differed from Scalia's in that he did not come to a definite conclusion regarding (1), but instead he rejected (2), arguing that even if Din's liberty was infringed upon, the reason explanation offered by the consulate for the denial (i.e., that Berashk had provided material support to a terrorist organization) fulfilled the government's obligations, and that further details were not required in cases where the application was denied due to terrorism or national security concerns.

Stephen Breyer wrote a dissenting opinion answering both (1) and (2) in the affirmative, in which he was joined by Ruth Bader Ginsburg, Sonia Sotomayor, and Elena Kagan. Breyer's dissent argued that forbidding people from living together did effectively impede the right to marry, and that the level of explanation offered for the denial was inadequate, similar to "telling a criminal defendant that he is accused of breaking the law."

Although Kerry v. Din upheld the doctrine of consular nonreviewability, legal commentators viewed it as not carrying much additional weight as a precedent since the decision was a plurality opinion.

=== Department of State v. Muñoz ===
In Department of State v. Muñoz (2024), the Supreme Court held that an American citizen "does not have a fundamental liberty interest in her noncitizen spouse being admitted to the country" that would allow an exception to the doctrine of consular nonreviewability.

== See also ==
- Plenary power
- Administrative Procedure Act (United States)
