= Gonzales v. City of Peoria =

Arizona district court case in 1983

Gonzalez v. City of Peoria, 722 F.2d 468, 474 (9th Cir. 1983) is an Arizona district court case which challenged the authority of local and state police to enforce federal immigration policy, specifically the Immigration and Nationality Act of 1965 (INA). The case closely examined the criminal statutes of the INA (8 U.S.C. §§1324,1325,1326) to determine whether local law enforcement can constitutionally stop or detain individuals who are suspected to have violated the INA. The appellants, 11 persons of Mexican descent, came to the United States legally and allege that local and state law enforcement agencies do not have the jurisdiction over cases regarding federal criminal offenses and that they were profiled based on their appearance alone. The court ruled in favor of law enforcement agencies, citing that Congress intentionally removed restrictive language in §1324 and included language authorizing local law enforcement, making §§1324,1325,1326 equal in terms of jurisdiction. This holds only if such practice is permissible under state law.

== Background ==
=== Plaintiff ===
One of the eleven plaintiffs in the case was a citizen of the United States while the rest of them were Mexican citizens. Three of the remaining ten plaintiffs were permanent residents, and the rest reside in Mexico but migrate to Maricopa County to work on citrus farms, harvesting crops. Each of them was legally present in the United States at the time of the incidents. They had varying incidents with law enforcement, interacting with them at the US Post Office, multiple supermarkets, as well as a shopping center. Some of the interactions with law enforcement began because of calls placed by third parties, such as in the case of Plaintiffs Trejo, Guerra, and Sanchez, in which officers were called to the scene because of a fight that had broken out at a market. Plaintiffs Arbiso and Ramirez were stopped because a vehicle they were near was disrupting the flow of traffic. Other incidents had no inciting factors outside of the officer's allegations of probable cause. The plaintiffs argued that being stopped due to their appearance was a violation of their rights under the Constitution and other civil rights statutes and that enforcement of the INA was under the sole jurisdiction of the federal government.

=== Defendant ===
Local law enforcement had responded to various different cases regarding immigration concerns in the past but had not made any advances in the arrest or detainment of undocumented or illegal immigrants in the past The law enforcement that interacted with the plaintiffs stated that they fit the description of illegal immigrants and had been engaging in suspicious activity, as permitted by the policy of the City of Peoria to enforce INA §1325.

=== Criminal vs Civil Immigration Offenses ===
In the case of Fong Yue Ting v. United States, the courts stated that deportation is not a criminal offense, but a civil one. This ruling had the consequence of not allowing deportees due process of law.

Criminal immigration offenses are primarily due to illegal entry after being deported, but in some instances entry into the United States without inspection and admission can be considered a criminal offense.

== Decision ==
Due to the limited nature of the criminal provisions present in the INA, the courts ruled that complex oversight was unnecessary in enforcing the law and the federal government was not the sole enforcement agency, therefore allowing state and local law enforcement agencies to enforce the criminal provisions of the INA. While the ruling held that state and local law enforcement had the authority to stop, question, and detain with probable cause according to federal criminal charges, the court lacked the inherent ability to make civil arrests. Unless explicitly stated, state and local police do not have the power to enforce the civil provisions of the INA according to the Gonzales court, only to narrowly regulate criminal immigration activity by illegal immigrants.

== Impacts ==
This case sets precedent for future cases that might contend the ability of state and local powers to adopt and enforce federally enforced immigration laws, making the distinction between criminal and civil offenses. It has also been argued that the precedent set by the case is not binding due to its assumptive nature, but has yet to be tested to its fullest extent in court.

In the year following the ruling of this case, the 10th Circuit Court ruled in United States v. Salinas-Calderon that state authorities have the power to investigate possible immigration violations alongside the use of probable cause, as set as precedent through Gonzales. Unlike Gonzales, Salinas-Calderon did not make the distinction between civil and criminal immigration offenses.
