= Wong Wing v. United States =

- Supreme Court of the United States

Argued April 1–2, 1896 Decided May 18, 1896
- Full case name: Wong Wing v. United States
- Citations: 163 U.S. 228 (more) 16 S. Ct. 977; 41 L. Ed. 140; 1896 U.S. LEXIS 2260

Court membership
- Chief Justice Melville Fuller Associate Justices Stephen J. Field · John M. Harlan; Horace Gray · David J. Brewer; Henry B. Brown · George Shiras Jr. Edward D. White · Rufus W. Peckham

Case opinions
- Majority: Shiras, joined by Harlan, Gray, Brown, White, Peckham
- Concur/dissent: Field
- Brewer took no part in the consideration or decision of the case.

Wong Wing v. United States, 163 U.S. 228 (1896), was a United States Supreme Court case in which the Court found that the Fifth and Sixth Amendments require a trial whenever a statute imposes a punishment of imprisonment at hard labor on an alien. A punishment of hard labor is not within Congress' plenary power, even if the alien is subject to deportation.

The case began in 1892 when Wong Wing and three other Chinese nationals were arrested for unlawful presence in the United States, violating the Geary Act. A commissioner of the Circuit Court for the Eastern District of Michigan sentenced the four men to 60 days imprisonment at hard labor, after which they would be deported to China. After the prisoners' petitions for writs of habeas corpus were denied, the Supreme Court granted cert.

In May 1896, the Supreme Court reversed the circuit court's judgment, ruling that Wing's Fifth and Sixth Amendment rights were violated because the commissioner lacked jurisdiction to sentence Wing to imprisonment at hard labor. The circuit court shouldn't have denied Wing's habeas corpus petition because Wing was sentenced to a criminal punishment without a jury trial. Thus the Court reversed the circuit court's judgment.

This case established that noncitizens subject to criminal proceedings are entitled to the same constitutional protections available to citizens. The Court held that the protections guaranteed by the Fifth and Sixth Amendments extend to foreign nationals as well as American citizens. The ruling was issued on the same day as the Court upheld racial segregation laws in its infamous Plessy v. Ferguson decision.

== Background ==
=== Geary Act ===
The Geary Act of 1892, an extension of the Chinese Exclusion Act, denied U.S. citizenship to Chinese immigrants. The Act required Chinese residents to carry residence certificates issued by the federal government to prove they entered the country legally. Section 4 of the Act of 1892 provides:

That any Chinese person or person of Chinese descent convicted and adjudged to be not lawfully entitled to be or remain in the United States shall be imprisoned at hard labor for a period of not exceeding one year and thereafter removed from the United States.

— Geary Act of 1892, Chapter 60

Briefly, Chinese individuals unlawfully present in the U.S. faced up to a year of imprisonment and hard labor followed by deportation.

=== Incident ===
On July 15, 1892, John Graves, commissioner of the U.S. Circuit Court for the Eastern District of Michigan, ruled that Wong Wing, Lee Poy, Lee You Tong, and Chan Wah Dong were illegal Chinese in the United States and had no right to remain in the United States. John Graves ruled that these people be imprisoned in the Detroit House of Correction for 60 days of hard labor from and including the date of commitment; in the end, they were to be removed from the United States to China.

The Chinese thus immediately applied for a writ of habeas corpus to the judges of the United States Court for the Eastern District of Michigan, requesting the release of their imprisonment and restraint of their liberty, alleging that doing so was unlawful, without warrant of law and contrary to the Constitution and laws of the United States. The rules were based on the Geary Act of 1892, entitled "An Act to prohibit the coming of Chinese persons into the United States."

=== District Appeal ===
On July 22, 1892, after hearing arguments from counsel, the district court ordered that the writ of habeas corpus be discharged and that the persons arrested be remanded to the custody of Nicholson, the keeper of the District house of correction, to serve their original sentences. Based on this decision, an appeal was filed with the Supreme Court. The United States Supreme Court granted certiorari.

== Opinion of the Court ==
In a majority opinion by Justice Shiras, the Court explained that Congress has the power to exclude, deport, and detain classes of noncitizens as a matter of public policy. Because deportation is not a criminal punishment, Congress may deport noncitizens without a jury trial. However, imprisonment at hard labor is a criminal punishment, and imposing criminal punishment without a jury trial to establish a defendant's guilt violates the Fifth and Sixth Amendments. The Court emphasized that constitutional protections are not limited to United States citizens. Any person within the United States is entitled to the protections guaranteed by the Fifth and Sixth Amendments.

As a resident in the United States, Wong Wing is entitled to the Fifth Amendment right to due process and the Sixth Amendment right to a jury trial. Wing was being held without being afforded those protections. Accordingly, Wing's petition for a writ of habeas corpus was granted. The judgment of the circuit court was reversed.

The Court first emphasized the validity of Chae Chan Ping v. United States (130 U.S. 581). Mr. Justice Field held that the Act to exclude Chinese laborers from the United States was a constitutional exercise of legislative power. The Court affirmed that Section 6 of the May 5, 1892 Act was constitutional and valid by reaffirming Fong Yue Ting v. United States (149 U.S. 698). The Court then cited Lem Moon Sing v. United States (158 U.S. 538), in which the Court rejected the petitioner's writ of habeas corpus. Mr. Justice Harlan, expressing the opinion of the Court, said that Congress exercised its power to exclude aliens solely through the executive, without judicial intervention, as determined by our previous decisions.

The Court pointed out the present appeal presented a different question the questions previously determined. The current question was whether a Chinese person can be lawfully convicted and sentenced to imprisonment at hard labor for a definite period by a commissioner without indictment or trial by jury. The question involved the constitutionality of Section 4 of the Act of 1892. the Court argued that:

We think it clear that detention, or temporary confinement, as part of the means necessary to give effect to the provisions for the exclusion or expulsion of aliens would be valid...Detention is not imprisonment in a legal sense.

— Wong Wing v. United States, 163 U.S. at 235

However, the Geary Act imposed imprisonment and hard labor in addition to deportation in an attempt to deter violations of the Act. To this regard, the Court expressed:

But when Congress sees fit to further promote such a policy by subjecting the persons of such aliens to infamous punishment at hard labor, or by confiscating their property, we think such legislation, to be valid, must provide for a judicial trial to establish the guilt of the accused.

— Wong Wing v. United States, 163 U.S. at 237

The Court then cited Ex Parte Wilson (114 U.S. 428) to declare that incarceration at hard labor is considered an infamous punishment. Also, in Yick Wo v. Hopkins (118 U.S. 356, 369), the Court ruled the Fourteenth Amendment to the Constitution is not limited to the protection of citizens. The Court applied the rule of the Fourteenth Amendment to the Fifth and Sixth Amendments.

Applying this reasoning to the Fifth and Sixth Amendments, it must be concluded that all persons within the territory of the United States are entitled to the protection guaranteed by those amendments, and that even aliens shall not be held to answer for a capital or other infamous crime, unless on a presentment or indictment of a grand jury, nor be deprived of life, liberty or property without due process of law.

— Wong Wing v. United States, 163 U.S. at 238

The Court finally decided that Section 4 of the 1892 Act was invalid because it conflicted with the Fifth Amendment to the Constitution, which states that "no person shall be held to answer for a capital, or other infamous crime, unless on a presentment or indictment of a grand jury, ... nor be deprived of life, liberty or property without due process of law," and is also in conflict with the Sixth Amendment to the Constitution, which provides" in all criminal proceedings, the accused shall enjoy the right to a speedy and public trial, by an impartial jury of the State and district wherein the crime shall have been committed."

The Court reversed the judgment of the Circuit Court.

=== Partial concurrence ===
Associate Justice Stephen Johnson Field concurred in part and dissented in part, agreeing that Wong was entitled to be discharged from his arrest and imprisonment because the government could only lawfully punish both citizens and noncitizens after a jury trial. However, he expressed deep concern about the government's argument that constitutional protections do not apply to political offenses committed by those who illegally enter and remain in the United States. He emphasized that the right to deport and exclude noncitizens does not give the government the right to inflict harsh and brutal punishment on them without constitutional safeguards.

Associate Justice David J. Brewer took no part in this case.

== Significance ==
Wong Wing v. United States was the first Supreme Court decision to invalidate a federal immigration statute, the first Supreme Court decision to hold that the Bill of Rights protects aliens from the federal government, and the first Supreme Court decision to affirm the constitutional rights of illegal aliens. Wong Wing v. United States addressed the power of Congress over immigration, the constitutional protection of aliens from the federal government, the rights of illegal aliens, the distinction between civil detention and criminal penalties, and the nature of hard labor as punishment.

A series of decisions issued by the judiciary in the 1880s and 1890s gave the executive branch broad authority to impose immigration restrictions in the name of national security. In Wong Wing v. United States, the Supreme Court further distinguished deportation from punishment. This decision placed immigration in a separate government bureaucracy. Since then, immigration cases have been handled by immigration officials, and an independent immigration court system has made legal decisions with fewer civic protections.

Wong Wing v. United States reaffirmed that deportation itself is not a punishment. That finding was later used to suggest that while immigration law violators cannot be sentenced to prison without constitutional due process, they can be detained (imprisoned) pending deportation. Extending Wong Wing's rationale, the Court held that because deportation is not punishment, indefinite incarceration pending deportation is therefore not punishment. Similarly, deportation is a civil action, not a criminal action.

== See also ==
- Geary Act
- Plessy v. Ferguson
- Chinese Exclusion Act
- Detroit House of Correction
- Chae Chan Ping v. United States
- Fong Yue Ting v. United States
- Yick Wo v. Hopkins
