= Department of State v. Muñoz =

- Supreme Court of the United States

Argued April 23, 2024 Decided June 21, 2024
- Full case name: United States Department of State, et al. v. Sandra Muñoz, et al.
- Docket no.: 23-334
- Citations: 602 U.S. 899 (more)
- Argument: Oral argument
- Decision: Opinion

Case history
- Prior: Case dismissed, Muñoz v. Department of State, 526 F.Supp.3d 709 (C.D. Cal. 2021) (mem.); Vacated and remanded, 50 F.4th 906 (9th Cir. 2022); Certiorari granted, 602 U.S. ___ (January 12, 2024)

Questions presented
- 1. Whether a consular officer's refusal of a visa to a U.S. citizen's noncitizen spouse impinges upon a constitutionally protected interest of the citizen.; 2. Whether, assuming that such a constitutional interest exists, notifying a visa applicant that he was deemed inadmissible under 8 U.S.C. § 1182(a)(3)(A)(ii) suffices to provide any process that is due.

Holding
- A citizen does not have a fundamental liberty interest in her noncitizen spouse being admitted to the country.

Court membership
- Chief Justice John Roberts Associate Justices Clarence Thomas · Samuel Alito; Sonia Sotomayor · Elena Kagan; Neil Gorsuch · Brett Kavanaugh; Amy Coney Barrett · Ketanji Brown Jackson

Case opinions
- Majority: Barrett, joined by Roberts, Thomas, Alito, Kavanaugh
- Concurrence: Gorsuch (in judgment)
- Dissent: Sotomayor, joined by Kagan, Jackson

Laws applied
- Due Process Clause of the Fifth Amendment to the United States Constitution

Department of State v. Muñoz, 602 U.S. 899 (2024), was a United States Supreme Court case in which the Court held that a "citizen does not have a fundamental liberty interest in her noncitizen spouse being admitted to the country." The case was a challenge by a U.S. citizen to the State Department's rejection of her non-citizen husband's application for an immigration visa with little explanation.

In the majority opinion by Justice Barrett, the Supreme Court concluded that history and tradition supported Congress's authority to decide whether a citizen's spouse may enter the country. As such, the majority concluded that the right to marry does not create an exception to consular nonreviewability, under which courts may not review the denial of a visa application.

The three dissenting justices, in an opinion by Justice Sotomayor, said that such a visa denial burdens the fundamental right of marriage, defined broadly in cases like Obergefell v. Hodges, such that the courts may scrutinize whether the government gave a facially legitimate explanation for the denial. However, they thought that the government had sufficiently explained the visa denial by saying it was based on suspected gang affiliation.

== Background ==
In 2008, Sandra C. Muñoz, a Los Angeles attorney and citizen of the United States, met Luis Asencio-Cordero, a citizen of El Salvador who was an undocumented immigrant. They married in 2010. In 2013, Asencio applied for a green card (permanent residency). As part of the process, he returned to El Salvador for a screening interview at the U.S. consulate in 2015, expecting to return to the United States after a few weeks. During the interview, the consular officer asked him to remove his clothing and asked about Asencio's tattoos, such as one depicting the Virgin of Guadalupe. Six months later, the government denied Asencio's visa application, saying that he was likely to engage in unlawful activities in the United States, without further explanation as to why.

The doctrine of consular nonreviewability in the United States stipulates that the denial of a visa to enter the country is generally not reviewable in court. However, the Supreme Court had made a narrow exception when the denial impairs the constitutional rights of someone else who is a U.S. citizen. When that exception applies, the government must give a "facially legitimate and bona fide reason" for the visa denial.

In 2017, Muñoz and Asencio filed a suit against the government in the U.S. District Court for the Central District of California. In 2018, three years after rejecting the visa application, the government stated that the denial was due to suspicion that Asencio was affiliated with MS-13, an international criminal gang. The district court agreed with the government that Muñoz could not challenge the denial of her husband's visa application, dismissing the case in a ruling by magistrate judge Alka Sagar.

The Ninth Circuit Court of Appeals vacated the district court's ruling, on the grounds that Muñoz's right to marriage and family life was protected by the Due Process Clause and that this right was impaired by the denial of Asencio's visa request and failure of the government to provide a detailed reasoning for its decision within a reasonable timeframe. Kermit V. Lipez, a circuit judge of the First Circuit (sitting by designation) wrote the majority opinion, joined by Mary M. Schroeder. Kenneth K. Lee dissented.

On January 12, 2024, the Supreme Court agreed to hear the case, granting the government's petition for a writ of certiorari. The Supreme Court heard oral argument on April 23.

== Supreme Court ==
Justice Amy Coney Barrett delivered the majority opinion, joined by Justices Roberts, Thomas, Alito, and Kavanaugh. Barrett rejected Muñoz's assertion that she had a fundamental liberty interest at stake. In order to claim "an unenumerated constitutional right", Barrett said, Muñoz "must show that the asserted right is 'deeply rooted in this Nation's history and tradition'" (quoting Washington v. Glucksberg (1997)). Pointing to Congress's history of regulating immigration of spouses, Barrett concluded that the right asserted did not meet the Glucksberg test.

=== Concurrence ===
Justice Gorsuch wrote a short opinion concurring in the judgment but not the majority's reasoning. Gorsuch would have reversed the decision of the court of appeals because the government had already given more explanation for its denial of the visa, as Muñoz had sought when filing the lawsuit, and because the government stated at oral argument that Muñoz could seek a new decision from the government on admitting her husband into the country.

=== Dissent ===
Justice Sonia Sotomayor wrote the dissenting opinion, joined by Justices Kagan and Jackson. Sotomayor agreed that the government should win the case, saying that the consulate's conclusion that Asencio was affiliated with MS-13 was a "facially legitimate and bona fide reason" sufficient, under Kleindienst v. Mandel (1972). However, Sotomayor faulted the majority for deciding more than necessary and for narrowly construing the fundamental right to marry recognized in cases like Obergefell v. Hodges (2015). Criticizing the majority's use of Washington v. Glucksberg to find that there was no constitutional right implicated in the case, Sotomayor said that "Obergefell rejected what the majority does today as 'inconsistent with the approach this Court has used in discussing [the] fundamental rights' of 'marriage and intimacy.'"

== See also ==
- Kerry v. Din (2015), a case in which the Supreme Court had previously considered whether there is a fundamental right to live with one's non-citizen spouse.
