= Fong Yue Ting v. United States =

- Supreme Court of the United States

Argued May 10, 1893 Decided May 15, 1893
- Full case name: Fong Yue Ting v. United States
- Citations: 149 U.S. 698 (more) 13 S. Ct. 1016; 37 L. Ed. 905; 1893 U.S. LEXIS 2340

Case history
- Prior: Appeal from the Circuit Court of the United States for the Southern District of New York

Court membership
- Chief Justice Melville Fuller Associate Justices Stephen J. Field · John M. Harlan; Horace Gray · Samuel Blatchford; David J. Brewer · Henry B. Brown; George Shiras Jr. · Howell E. Jackson

Case opinions
- Majority: Gray, joined by Blatchford, Brown, Jackson, Shiras
- Dissent: Brewer
- Dissent: Field
- Dissent: Fuller
- Harlan took no part in the consideration or decision of the case.

Laws applied
- Geary Act

Fong Yue Ting v. United States, 149 U.S. 698 (1893), decided by the United States Supreme Court on May 15, 1893, was a case challenging provisions in Section 6 of the Geary Act of 1892 that extended and amended the Chinese Exclusion Act of 1882. The provisions in question required Chinese in the United States to obtain certificates of residency and allowed for the arrest and the deportation of Chinese who had failed to obtain these certificates, even if they had not violated any other laws. The case involved writs of habeas corpus from Fong Yue Ting and two other Chinese citizens residing in New York City who were arrested and detained for not having certificates. The Supreme Court decision (5 to 3) was in favor of the United States government, upholding the Geary Act and denying the writs of habeas corpus.

== Background ==
In 1868, the United States and China entered into the Burlingame Treaty, establishing formal friendly relations between the two countries, and granting China most favored nation status. The treaty encouraged immigration from China, and granted some privileges to citizens of either country residing in the other, but withheld the privilege of naturalization for immigrants from China.

On November 17, 1880, the Burlingame Treaty was amended to suspend but not prohibit immigration from China. The amendment was called the Treaty Regulating Immigration from China, and historians refer to it as the Angell Treaty of 1880. The prefix stated: "The United States, because of the constantly increasing immigration of Chinese labourers to the territory of the United States and the embarrassments consequent upon such immigration now desires to negotiate a modification of the existing Treaties which shall not be in direct contravention to their spirit."

In 1882, the Chinese Exclusion Act was passed, forbidding (for ten years) the immigration of skilled and unskilled laborers from China to the United States. The rights of prior immigrants were not significantly amended. An 1884 Amendment to the Chinese Exclusion Act required Chinese citizens to obtain re-entry permits if they wished to return after temporarily leaving the United States. On October 1, 1888, the United States government passed the Scott Act. Authored by William Lawrence Scott of Pennsylvania, the act was signed into law by United States President Grover Cleveland on October 1, 1888. The act forbade re-entry of Chinese immigrants to the United States. This went against the privileges that the Burlingame Treaty gave Chinese immigrants to the United States. The 1888 statute was upheld in Chae Chan Ping v. United States.

In 1892, as the ten-year period for the original Chinese Exclusion Act was scheduled to expire, the exclusion was extended for another 10 years with the Geary Act. The Geary Act, however, included a number of additional provisions affecting the lives of Chinese already living in the United States. One key set of provisions shifted the burden of proof for demonstrating the right to be in the United States on to the Chinese resident.

The chief enforcement mechanism for this change was "certificates of residence". Chinese already in the United States were required to possess "certificates of residence" that served as proof that they had entered the United States legally and had the right to remain in the country. The certificates of residence contained the name, age, local residence, occupation, and photograph of the applicant.

The following requirements for the certificate were relevant:

- The Chinese resident needed two white witnesses to testify to the person's immigration status in order to be issued the certificate.
- All Chinese laborers currently in the United States were required to obtain the certification within a year of the passage of the law, with a duplicate kept in the office of the Collector of Internal Revenue.

The following enforcement penalties gave teeth to the requirement for a certificate:

- Any Chinese laborer within the United States without this certificate of residence was "deemed and adjudged to be unlawfully in the United States" and could be arrested and forced to do hard labor, and be deported after a year.
- Penalties were prescribed for falsification of information on the certificates.
- Chinese were denied bail in habeas corpus proceedings. In particular, that meant that any Chinese detained on account of not having certificates could not be released on bail.

In particular, possession of the certificate itself became a requirement of law, regardless of whether the person had entered unlawfully.

== Case ==
The case in question involved petitions by three Chinese citizens residing in the United States, each of whom had not successfully obtained certificates of residence though with slight differences:

- The first petitioner claimed that he had arrived in the United States from China in or before 1879. For more than a year, he had resided in New York City. He was arrested by the marshal for not having a certificate of residence and had never applied for one.
- The second petitioner's situation was similar to the first, except that the Chinese citizen had been shown to a judge, who had agreed to let the marshal hold him.
- The third petitioner had applied for a certificate of residence but had not been granted one because all the witnesses he could secure were Chinese, and the Geary Act required white witnesses. He was arrested and detained after failing to obtain the certificate.

In all three cases, the petitioner (the Chinese citizen) alleged that his arrest and detention were without due process of law, and that Section 6 of the Geary Act, which required a "white witness" and had been used to justify the arrest and detention, was unconstitutional and void.

== Decision ==
=== Majority opinion ===
The case was decided in favor of the United States government by a margin of 5 to 3, with the majority opinion delivered by Justice Horace Gray. (Justice John Marshall Harlan was abroad at the time and thus was unable to participate.) The opinion discussed similarities and differences with past cases. Some of the cases discussed, and the key points of similarity and difference, are noted below:

- The main cited precedent for the decision was Chae Chan Ping v. United States (1889, also known as the Chinese Exclusion Case), where the Supreme Court unanimously sided with the government. According to the Court's opinion on the Chinese Exclusion Case written by Stephen Johnson Field, the power to exclude foreigners was an "incident of sovereignty", therefore Congress could revoke the permits that were granted to Chinese laborers before 1888. The plurality opinion in Fong Yue Ting v. United States argued that the same power also extended to the authority to deport and set conditions of residence for people who were not citizens.
- Another cited precedent for deferring to the authority of the government on immigration decisions was Nishimura Ekiu v. United States (1891), where a challenge to a decision made under the Immigration Act of 1891 was rejected.
- The similarity with Chy Lung v. Freeman (1875) was dismissed since that case denied states the authority to impose restrictions on immigration beyond what was specified in federal immigration law, whereas the actions of the state of New York in this case were consistent with federal law.
- Key differences were noted from Chew Heong v. United States (1884) and United States v. Jung Ah Lung (1888). In both cases, the decisions were made based on the goal that, unless unavoidably, the acts or amendments in question should not apply retroactively. However, the Geary Act was clear in its statement and intention and provided clear instructions to Chinese citizens regarding how to obtain the certificates of residence, for which they had time after the passage of the Act.
- The similarity with Yick Wo v. Hopkins (1886) and the application of the Fourteenth Amendment was rejected. The Supreme Court opinion clarified that non-citizens who had acquired a domicile in the United States were entitled the equal protection of the law while they were residing legally, but that did not preclude them from being subject to deportation or having to do additional work to obtain certification, as long as those actions were authorized by legislative statutes.

=== Brewer's dissent ===
Justice David J. Brewer dissented from the plurality opinion. He rested his opinion on three propositions:

1. The persons against whom the penalties of Section 6 of the Geary Act are directed are persons lawfully residing within the United States.
2. They are within the protection of the Constitution, and secured by its guarantees against oppression and wrong.
3. Section 6 deprives them of liberty and imposes punishment without due process of law, and in disregard of constitutional guaranties, especially those found in the 4th, 5th, 6th, and 8th articles of the amendments.

Brewer made a key distinction between this case and previous cases such as Chae Chan Ping v. United States or Nishimura Ekiu v. United States: the United States Constitution applied only within the territory of the United States and therefore its protections did not apply to aliens seeking admission, but they applied to aliens who had been admitted. He also noted that the Geary Act was unprecedented in that it applied to Chinese who had already entered the United States and were present in the country for the long term as resident aliens, rather than as temporary travelers. He argued that resident aliens deserved the full measure of constitutional protections.

=== Field's dissent ===
Stephen Johnson Field dissented from the plurality opinion and sided instead with the petitioners. Unlike the other judges, Field had historically placed more importance on protecting and upholding the rights of Chinese already in the United States but was also more deferential to stronger restrictions on admission. In particular:

- Field had penned the opinion in the unanimously decided Chae Chan Ping v. United States, that argued based on an inherent authority of the United States federal government to regulate immigration. He had also dissented from the Supreme Court decision in Chew Heong v. United States in favor of the petitioner; he argued that Chew Heong could be denied entry.
- On the other hand, Field had, in the past, as a jurist in California, opined against California laws discriminating against migrants in the state. Most notably, he struck down the Pigtail Ordinance.

In his dissenting opinion in Fong Yue Ting v. United States, Field acknowledged the legitimacy of the United States federal government setting conditions on residence and determining whether people were unlawfully present in order to be able to deport them. However, he held deportation of resident aliens to a higher bar than refusing them entry. In particular, he made the following arguments:

- He argued that deportation was a cruel and unusual punishment for the offense of failing to obtain a certificate, and that the process put in place by the Geary Act was insufficient due process. Instead, the burden of proof when deporting aliens should be on the government to demonstrate that the alien's presence was unlawful.
- He noted that all of the Court cases cited as precedents in the plurality opinion were cases involving refusal to admit aliens, rather than cases of deportation.
- He acknowledged that there were some precedents from Europe for deportation, but rejected the idea of applying these precedents to the United States, arguing that the United States had a different system of government with limited powers.

=== Fuller's dissent ===
The Court's Chief Justice, Melville Fuller, dissented from the plurality opinion. Fuller argued that the Geary Act was improper insofar as it directed the performance of a judicial function in a particular way, without all the procedural guarantees of a judicial trial. Fuller also expressed concern that the Geary Act contained within it "the germs of the assertion of an unlimited and arbitrary power, in general, incompatible with the immutable principles of justice, inconsistent with the nature of our Government, and in conflict with the written Constitution by which that Government was created and those principles secured."

== Subsequent developments ==
=== Value as precedent for later doctrines in immigration law ===
In this case and in most of the other Chinese Exclusion Cases, the Supreme Court repeatedly sided with the United States government and against aliens by offering the rationale that immigration policy and its enforcement were a matter for the legislative and executive branches. Some commentators argue that the case was an important precedent in establishing the plenary power doctrine that immunizes from judicial review the substantive immigration decisions of the United States Congress and the executive branch of the United States government. Others have disagreed about the significance of these cases for plenary power. The defining case for the plenary power doctrine, Knauff v. Shaughnessy (1950) did not explicitly cite the case.

Among the early court decisions related to regulation of immigration and aliens, it was the first case to uphold broad federal powers to set conditions on residence and deport aliens who had been living lawfully in the United States.
