= United States ex rel. Knauff v. Shaughnessy =

U.S. Immigration Supreme Court Case

- Supreme Court of the United States

Decided January 16, 1950
- Full case name: United States ex rel. Knauff v. Shaughnessy
- Citations: 338 U.S. 537 (more)

Holding
- (a) Congress is "implementing an inherent executive power" by authorizing the executive to exercise the power of exclusion. (b) Due process for an alien denied entry is “whatever the procedure authorized by Congress is". Admission of aliens to the United States is a privilege granted by the government subject to conditions prescribed by Congress. (c)The decision to deny entry “is final and conclusive” and “it is not within the province of any court, unless expressly authorized by law, to review the determination of the political branch of the Government to exclude a given alien.”

Court membership
- Chief Justice Fred M. Vinson Associate Justices Hugo Black · Stanley F. Reed; Felix Frankfurter · William O. Douglas; Robert H. Jackson · Harold H. Burton; Tom C. Clark · Sherman Minton

Case opinions
- Majority: Minton, joined by Vinson, Reed, Burton
- Dissent: Frankfurter
- Dissent: Jackson, joined by Black and Frankfurter
- Douglas and Clark took no part in the consideration or decision of the case.

United States ex rel. Knauff v. Shaughnessy, 338 U.S. 537 (1950), was a United States Supreme Court concerning consular nonreviewability, the doctrine that an un-admitted foreigner cannot seek judicial review of a denial of admission to the country.

In a four-to-three decision, this case firmly demonstrates the plenary powers of Congress and the Executive Branch, as it is one of the first cases that bars the judicial review of executive or legislative orders of exclusion in most circumstances.

== Background ==
Ellen Knauff, a German national born in 1915, worked as a civilian employee of the United States Army in Germany. In 1948, she married Kurt Knauff, a United States citizen and Army veteran. Knauff traveled to the United States to apply for naturalization under the War Brides Act in order to live in the country with her husband. On August 14, 1948, Knauff arrived in the United States, however, she was detained at Ellis Island and temporarily excluded. Since Knauff was detained, she filed a habeas corpus petition to challenge her detention and exclusion from the United States with a district court, which was denied. She appealed the decision to the Court of Appeals, which was also denied, so the case went to the Supreme Court.

== Decision of the Court ==
On January 16, 1950, the Supreme Court delivered its ruling. Justice Minton issued the opinion of the court The Court noted that exclusion was different from deporting someone already admitted, implying that non-citizens outside the border have few procedural rights and no vested rights. Therefore, courts will not review exclusion decisions unless specifically authorized by statute.

The legal authority for Knauff's exclusion from the United States stemmed from a 1941 Congressional Act, passed during a national emergency, which authorized the President to impose additional restrictions on entry. President Franklin D. Roosevelt issued Proclamation 2523 under this act, allowing the Secretary of State and Attorney General to make regulations. One such regulation permitted the exclusion of any alien whose entry was deemed prejudicial to U.S. interests, without a formal hearing. This special exclusion power was authorized not just for the period of active fighting, but for the duration of both the war and the national emergency proclaimed on May 27, 1941. The Court notes that this national emergency was still in effect (and, technically, a "state of war" still existed). Therefore, the 1941 Act, the emergency authority providing for exclusion without a hearing was still legally operative when Knauff was denied entry.

The Court began by stating a foundational principle of immigration law: an alien has no vested right to enter the United States. "Whatever the procedure authorized by Congress is, it is due process as far as an alien denied entry is concerned." This principle, established in prior cases like Nishimura Ekiu v. United States, places the authority to control borders squarely with the political branches of government. The implication is that the procedural safeguards typically required in other contexts do not necessarily apply at the border. Thus, the role of the court in this case was to conduct a limited inquiry regarding whether the Attorney General had the authority to order exclusions, not if the rights of Knauff were violated when she was denied a hearing.

The Court rejected the argument that Congress unconstitutionally delegated legislative power to the President. Citing United States v. Curtiss-Wright Export Corp., the Court treated immigration control as "a fundamental act of sovereignty" that is inherent in the executive branch's power to conduct foreign affairs. Therefore, when Congress authorized the President to set exclusion procedures, it was "implementing an inherent executive power." This reflected a highly deferential stance toward executive discretion in matters of national security and border control.

Despite Knauff attempting to immigrate into the United States using the War Brides Act, the court determined the legislation did not change Knauff's status as an alien, and therefore she was still held to the Attorney General's authority and could be excluded.

=== Frankfurter's dissent ===
Justice Felix Frankfurter criticized the majority's harsh application of the law. The War Brides Act was intended for the benefit of citizens who have served in the military. The majority's narrow reading of the Act's statutory language "if otherwise admissible under immigration laws" allowed the executive to exclude Knauff without due process, which Frankfurter said was contrary to the congressional intent to reunite soldiers with their foreign-born wives and children. He criticized the majority's excessive textualism: "The letter killeth". The dissent concluded that such a "substantial contradiction" of the War Brides Act's core purpose should not have been inferred through "elaborate implication".

=== Jackson's dissent ===
Supreme Court Justice Robert H. Jackson wrote the primary dissent in this case. He aligned himself with the majority of the court and agreed that Congress did have the authority to regulate who may and may not be excluded from the United States. However, Justice Jackson argued that the executive and legislative branches do not have the authority to exclude Knauff without making her aware of why she is being excluded, the proof of her guilt, and an opportunity for Knauff to respond. Justice Jackson urged the Attorney General to either provide the supporting evidence and justification for Kauff's exclusion or grant her entry into the United States.

== Significance ==
The United States ex rel. Knauff v. Shaughnessy ruling, which bars judicial review for orders of exclusion unless specifically stated in law, is used as the foundation of the doctrine of consular nonreviewability. The doctrine of consular nonreviewability prohibits aliens abroad from disputing decisions made by U.S. consular officers to deny visas based on statutory grounds. Additionally, the rulings held in this case have been utilized in a range of immigration cases, from upholding deportations based on confidential information to preventing a Marxist speaker from entering the country by denying their visa.

== See also ==
- Shaughnessy v. United States ex rel. Mezei
