= Harisiades v. Shaughnessy =

1952 Supreme Court of the United States case on freedom of speech

- Supreme Court of the United States

Argued 5 December, 1951 Decided 10 March, 1952
- Full case name: Harisiades v. Shaughnessy, District Director of Immigration and Naturalization
- Citations: 342 U.S. 580 (more)

Holding
- The Alien Registration Act of 1940's authorization of deportation for legal residents based on Communist Party membership, even past, does not violate the Fifth Amendment, the First Amendment, Due Process, nor the Ex Post Facto Clause.

Court membership
- Chief Justice Fred M. Vinson Associate Justices Hugo Black · Stanley F. Reed; Felix Frankfurter · William O. Douglas; Robert H. Jackson · Harold H. Burton; Tom C. Clark · Sherman Minton

Case opinions
- Majority: Jackson, joined by Minton, Reed, Vinson, and Burton
- Concurrence: Frankfurter
- Dissent: Douglas, joined by Black
- Clark took no part in the consideration or decision of the case.

Harisiades v. Shaughnessy, 342 U.S. 580 (1952), was a United States Supreme Court case which determined that the Alien Registration Act of 1940's authorization of deportation of legal residents for membership, even past, in communist parties did not violate the First Amendment, the Fifth Amendment, nor the constitution's Ex Post Facto Clause.

The case was a consolidation of three similar cases, Mascitti v. McGrath, Coleman v. McGrath, and Harisiades v. Shaughnessy, all brought by long time legal residents of the United States who were in the process of being deported under the Alien Registration Act for their past membership in communist political parties.

== Background ==
=== Alien Registration Act of 1940 ===
The Alien Registration Act of 1940, also known as the Smith Act, authorizes the deportation of legal residents of the United States as a penalty for advocacy to overthrow the government under title 2. Membership in a communist party was at the time treated automatically as advocacy for overthrow of the government.

==== Dennis v. United States ====
The 1951 Supreme Court case Dennis v. United States upheld prosecutions under the Smith Act for mere advocacy, as opposed to direct action, to violently overthrow the government as constitutional.

=== First Amendment ===
In the United States, legal residents, although not citizens, still enjoy most of the same constitutional rights. Under the Fourteenth Amendment's Equal Protection Clause, all people within the jurisdiction of the U.S. are promised equal protection under the law. But, there are some rights and privileges legal residents do not have, such as voting in federal elections and running for public office. The First Amendment does protect non-citizens, but not in all situations. For example, people applying for residency, visas, or citizenship will be asked and investigated about their affiliations and can be denied based on what would normally be protected under the freedom of association, speech, etc.

=== Ex-Post Facto Clause ===
Ex post facto is a legal term used to describe laws which retroactively punish actions, typically in the criminal context. Article 1, § 9 of the United States Constitution prohibits Congress from enacting any laws which apply ex post facto, this is referred to as the constitution's Ex Post Facto Clause.

== Case facts ==
=== Plaintiffs ===
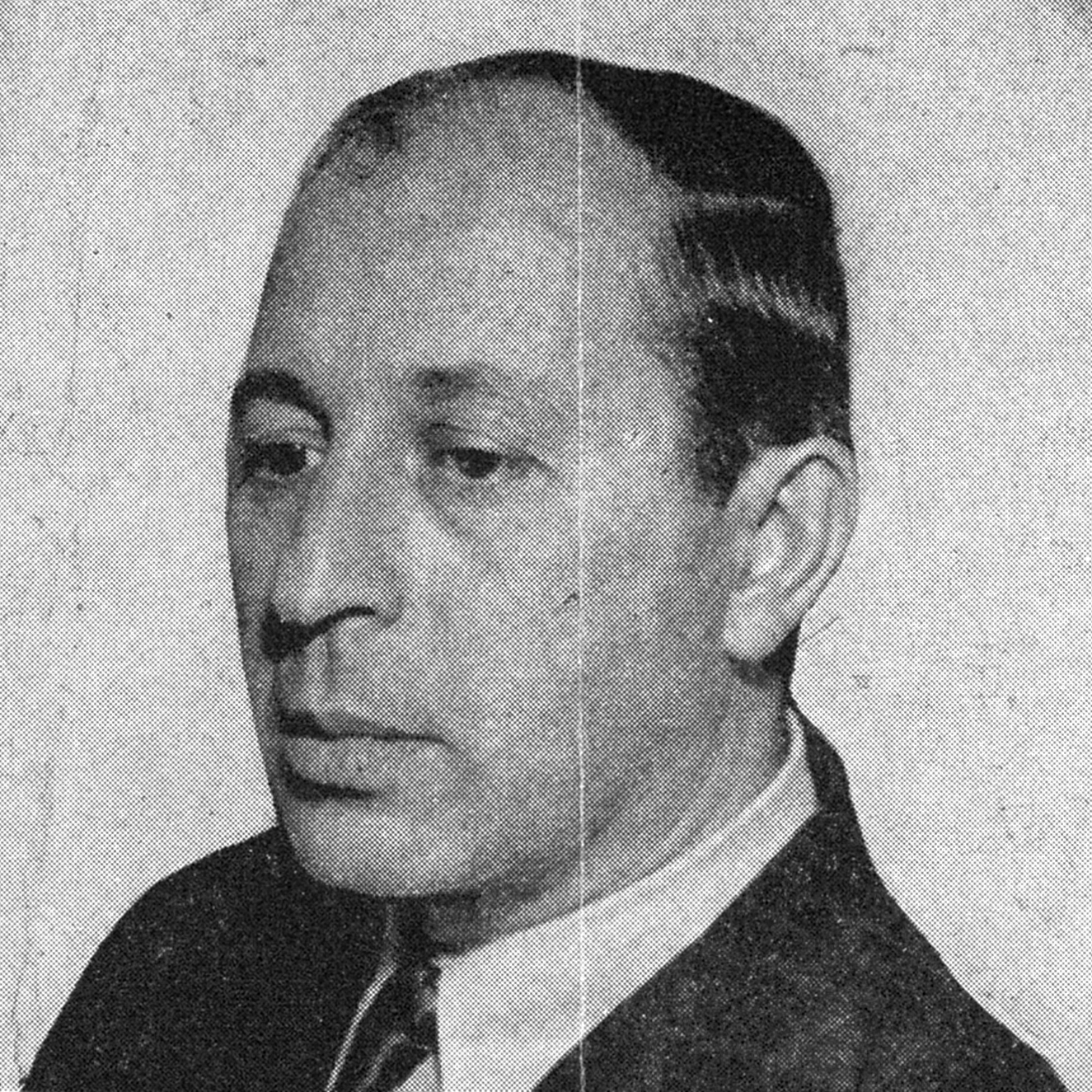
Harisiades c. 1950

Peter Harisiades was a Greek immigrant who came to the United States at 13 years old with his father in 1916. At the time of this case, he was married with two kids; his wife and kids were all American citizens. He joined the Communist Party USA (then the Worker's Party) in 1925 and was kicked out of the organization in 1939 as a part of the party's attempt to protect its non-citizen members, whose membership put them in danger of deportation. A warrant was issued for his deportation on December 16, 1948. Harisiades was represented at the Supreme Court by Carol Weiss King.

Luigi Mascitti was an Italian immigrant who came to the country in 1920 at 16 years old. At the time of the case, he was married to a fellow legal resident and had one American-born child. Between 1923 and 1929, he was a member of the Communist Party or its youth wing.

Dora Coleman was a Jewish Russian immigrant who came to the United States in 1914 at the age of 13. After her arrival, she began working at sweatshops in Philadelphia and eventually became a union organizer in her teens. At the time of the case, she was married to an American citizen, had three American-born children, and owned a bric-à-brac shop. She applied for naturalization in 1944. She was represented by David Rein.

All plaintiffs were members of the parties in question prior to the passing of the Alien Registration Act in 1940 and had been in the US for over 30 years.

=== McGrath and Shaughnessy ===
James Howard McGrath was U.S. Attorney General from 1949 to 1952. Edward J. Shaughnessy was the District Director of Immigration and Naturalization (INS).

== District Court ==
Harisiades sued to review the proceedings which lead to the issuance of a warrant of deportation against him. The United States District Court for the Southern District of New York ruled in Harisiades v. Shaughnessy on April 4, 1950; District Judge Leibell sided with Shaughnessy and the INS and denied all of Harisiades' motions. Irving H. Saypol, United States Attorney for the Southern District of New York, acted as attorney for the respondent.

== Supreme Court ==
The cases of Harisiades, Mascitti, and Coleman were consolidated into one due to the similarities in facts. The ruling was 6-2, with Justices Douglas and Black in Dissent. Justice Tom C. Clark took no part in the consideration or decision of the case.

=== Majority ===
Justice Robert H. Jackson wrote for the majority. The majority affirmed the lower court's ruling on the case, rejecting the plaintiff's request to prevent their deportations. It concluded that the law and its application in these cases did not deprive legal residents of liberty without due process under the Fifth Amendment, constitute an overstep by Congress, violate the First Amendment's freedom of speech/assembly clause, cause severe hardship as to violate the Due Process Clause, nor constitute an unconstitutional ex post facto law.

The court held that because deportation is classified as a civil penalty, as opposed to a criminal punishment, it was not subject to the Ex Post Facto Clause, describing it as "simply a refusal by the government to harbor persons whom it does not want".

Jackson also found immigration related-legislation to be mostly immune from substantive due process, describing it as "so exclusively entrusted to the political branches of government as to be largely immune from judicial inquiry or interference", while also acknowledging deportation may be “cruel”.

=== Frankfurter concurrence ===
Justice Felix Frankfurter wrote in concurrence with the majority opinion. His opinion focused on Congress holding the primary responsibility on matters relating to naturalization, writing:

... [Congress] decided to restrict the right of immigration about seventy years ago, this Court thereupon and ever since has recognized that the determination of a selective and exclusionary immigration policy was for the Congress and not for the Judiciary. The conditions for entry of every alien, the particular classes of aliens that shall be denied entry altogether, the basis for determining such classification, the right to terminate hospitality to aliens, the grounds on which such determination shall be based, have been recognized as matters solely for the responsibility of the Congress and wholly outside the power of this Court to control.

=== Douglas dissent ===
Justice William O. Douglas wrote in dissent of the majority opinion, with which Justice Hugo Black concurred. His primary argument was that the Alien Registration Act punished past belief and ideology, not conduct, and therefore violated the deportee's freedom of speech. He writes,

There are two possible bases for sustaining this Act:

(1) A person who was once a Communist is tainted for all time, and forever dangerous to our society; or
(2) Punishment through banishment from the country may be placed upon an alien not for what he did, but for what his political views once were.

Each of these is foreign to our philosophy. We repudiate our traditions of tolerance and our articles of faith based upon the Bill of Rights when we bow to them by sustaining an Act of Congress which has them as a foundation.

He also questioned the holding in Fong Yue Ting v. United States (1893).

== Legacy ==
Following the ruling, Dora Coleman could not be deported because the USSR refused to take her. Stuck in a legal limbo, she stayed in Philadelphia and died of a stroke in her early sixties after living in fear of detention.

Harisiades v. Shaughnessy had an impact on both immigration and First Amendment law.

The case was highlighted after the March 2025 detention of Mahmoud Khalil during the second Trump administration's broader crackdown on immigrants, with the Algemeiner Journal and Center for Immigration Studies pointing to it as precedent supporting the actions of the government and Nadine Strossen using it as an example of these situations' legal complexity.

The second Trump administration's Department of Justice cited Harisiades v. Shaughnessy as precedent demonstrating that "Article II [of the constitution] confers upon the President expansive authority over foreign affairs, national security, and immigration" in defense of its March 2025 deportation of Venezuelan immigrants to El Salvador's Terrorism Confinement Center.

== See also ==
- Cold War
- Communist Party USA
- First Red Scare
- Smith Act trials of Communist Party leaders
