= Scott Act of 1888 =

US law

- Long title: An Act a supplement to an act entitled "An Act to execute certain treaty stipulations relating to Chinese," approved the sixth day of May eighteen hundred and eighty-two.
- Enacted by: the 50th United States Congress
- Effective: October 1, 1888

Citations
- Public law: 50-1064
- Statutes at Large: 25 Stat. 504

Legislative history
- Introduced in the House as H.R. 11336 by William Lawrence Scott (D–PA) on July 15, 1888; Passed the Senate on August 8, 1888 (40-3, in lieu of S. 3304); Passed the House on August 20, 1888 (Passed) with amendment; House agreed to House amendment on September 13, 1888 (Passed); Signed into law by President Grover Cleveland on October 1, 1888

The Scott Act was a United States law that prohibited U.S. resident Chinese laborers from returning to the United States. Its main author was William Lawrence Scott of Pennsylvania, and it was signed into law by U.S. President Grover Cleveland on October 1, 1888. It was introduced to expand upon the Chinese Exclusion Act passed in 1882 and left an estimated 20,000-30,000 Chinese outside the United States at the time of its passage stranded, with no option to return to their U.S. residence.

== History ==
=== Chinese Exclusion ===
In the 1850s, Chinese workers migrated to the United States to work in gold mines, take jobs in agriculture and factories, and built railroads in the American West. More than 10,000 workers built the railroad tracks in the American West by hand, 80% of whom were Chinese migrant workers. This influx of Chinese immigrants led to a strong anti-Chinese sentiment among White American workers. In 1880, the Angell Treaty suspended the immigration of Chinese laborers for 10 years and required every Chinese person traveling in or out of the United States to carry a certificate identifying their status as a worker, scholar, diplomat, or merchant. In 1882, Congress passed these terms as the Chinese Exclusion Act. After this, Chinese exclusion was extended for 10 more years with the 1892 Geary Act, then another 10 in 1902. It was made indefinite in 1904.

=== Bayard-Zhang Treaty ===
Prior to the Scott Act, the governments of the United States and the Great Qing Empire of China had negotiated the Bayard-Zhang Treaty, whereby the Chinese government would restrict emigration to the United States, and in exchange, the U.S. government would crack down on discrimination and poor treatment against Chinese in the United States. In May 1888, the Senate approved the Bayard-Zhang Treaty, but with amendments that canceled all return certificates of Chinese who were outside of the United States and a 20-year indefinite ban that would continue unless the treaty was renegotiated or renounced. Congress on the whole then passed legislation that enforced the treaty, assuming China would ratify in 1888.

However, the treaty met with considerable opposition, both in China (particularly Guangdong province) and among the Chinese in the United States, and a delay in ratification on China's part stoked fears that the treaty would be rejected.

=== Scott Act ===
On September 3, 1888, Representative William Lawrence Scott, a Democrat of Pennsylvania, introduced the Scott Act to force the stipulations of the treaty into American law without any agreement from the Chinese government. All Chinese laborers who were residents of the United States were barred from traveling abroad, and those who were abroad—even those who had certificates allowing their return when the act was passed—were not allowed to return.

The act read, "Be it enacted by the senate and house of representatives of the United States of America, in congress assembled, that from and after the passage of this act it shall be unlawful for and Chinese laborer who shall at any time heretofore have been . . . a resident within the United States, and who shall have departed, or shall depart, therefrom, and shall not have returned before the passage of this act, to return to or remain the United States."

Scott claimed there were copious amounts of fake Chinese return documents and that the system was being abused, although few actual cases of fraud had been caught. "As the truth is a merchantable commodity from a Chinese point of view, those certificates were in many instances sold to Chinamen who had never been in this country, who took them and came to the United States in violation of the law," Scott said when introducing the act.

In congressional debate regarding the Scott Act, representatives' only other concern was keeping those certificate holders who weren't in the United States from returning. They were concerned Scott's proposed act wouldn't be strict enough to accomplish this, but he assured them it would be. After half an hour of debate, the bill was passed by voice vote. The Senate took up the bill hours after it passed in the House. Senator Henry Teller, Republican of Colorado, said of the act, "There are now about one hundred thousand Chinese who have come into this country, and I myself will welcome any legislation that shall deport every single one of them from the United States and send them back to China, where they belong." The bill passed in the Senate as well.

When news of the law passing reached San Francisco, revelers spilled into the streets in exultation. Both the Democratic and Republican state central committees ordered 100-gun salutes. Bonfires blazed throughout the city in celebration. In Los Angeles, Democrats similarly staged a celebration. The Alta California newspaper called it "California's day of jubilee."

Due to public pressure, the Chinese government chose not to ratify the treaty, and President Grover Cleveland signed the Scott Act into law on October 1, 1888. In an accompanying message he sent to Congress along with the law, he justified the act by saying China had promised in the renounced Bayard-Zhang treaty to prevent workers from coming to the United States. In absence of this act, Cleveland said, the United States had to act, "An emergency has arisen, in which the Government of the United States is called upon to act in self-defense by the exercise of its legislative power. I cannot but regard the expressed demand on the part of China for a reexamination and renewed discussion of the topics so completely covered by mutual treaty stipulations, as an indefinite postponement and practical abandonment on the objects we have in view..." He recommended that separate legislation should be introduced to allow reentry of the Chinese who were already in transit back to the United States, but this never happened. He also recommended that the United States pay $276,619.75 for injuries to the Chinese in America from violence, which had been a provision of the renounced Bayard-Zhang Treaty, which also never happened.

=== Supreme Court challenge and upholding ===
On October 8, 1888, Chae Chan Ping, a Chinese citizen and unskilled laborer working in San Francisco, returned to the US after a trip home to China. He was stopped at the port and denied entry. He challenged the denial and the case reached the Supreme Court. This case, Chae Chan Ping v. United States, was decided on May 13, 1889, in favor of the United States. The Supreme Court said its hands were tied because Congress’ power to exclude aliens was absolute because it was a sovereign power granted by the constitution that could be exercised at any time, “when, in the judgment of the government, the interests of the country require it, cannot be granted away or restrained on behalf of any one.”

The Supreme Court decision was an important precedent both for establishing the federal government's discretionary power over immigration and upholding the government's authority to pass and enforce legislation contradictory to the terms of past international treaties (the treaty in question being the Burlingame Treaty of 1868).

== See also ==
- Chinatown, Denver
- Chinese Exclusion
- Chinese American history
- List of United States Immigration Acts
- Chae Chan Ping v. United States
- United States v. Wong Kim Ark, which held that the Chinese Exclusion Act could not overrule the citizenship of those born in the U.S. to Chinese parents

== Sources ==
- Ahmad, Diana Lynn (1997). ""Caves of Oblivion": Opium Dens and Exclusion Laws, 1850-1882". University of Missouri-Columbia. OCLC 42921756.
- Ahmad, Diana L. (2007). The Opium Debate and Chinese Exclusion Laws in the Nineteenth-Century American West. University of Nevada Press. ISBN 978-0874176988. OCLC 71004058.
- Gold, Martin (2011). Forbidden Citizens: Chinese Exclusion and the U.S. Congress : A Legislative History. Alexandria, Virginia: The Capitol Net Inc. ISBN 978-1587332357. OCLC 785081707.
- Luo, Michael (2025). Strangers in the Land: Exclusion, Belonging, and the Epic Story of the Chinese in America. Doubleday. ISBN 978-0385548588.
- Wong, Edlie L. (2015). Racial Reconstruction: Black Inclusion, Chinese Exclusion, and the Fictions of Citizenship. New York University Press. ISBN 978-1479817962. OCLC 906010899.
- Zhu, Liping (2013). The Road to Chinese Exclusion: The Denver Riot, 1880 Election, and Rise of the West. University Press of Kansas. ISBN 978-0700619191. OCLC 837923477.
