= Judicial deference =

Act of a judiciary deferring to another branch of government

Judicial deference is the condition of a court yielding or submitting its judgment to that of another legitimate party, such as the executive branch in the case of national defense. It is most commonly found in countries such as the United Kingdom, which lack entrenched clauses in their constitutions, because the essential purpose of such documents is to limit the power of the legislature.

== United Kingdom ==
In Regina v. Director of Public Prosecutions Ex Parte Kebeline and Others [1999], Lord Hope explained that courts should "defer, on democratic grounds, to the considered opinion of the elected body as to where the balance is to be struck between the rights of the individual and the needs of society". Nevertheless, the doctrine has been criticised for representing a way in which the courts should act obediently to the British Parliament to uphold the doctrine of parliamentary sovereignty.

However, any suggestions that the House of Lords was being unduly servile to Parliament were overturned by A v Home Secretary (No 2) [2005]. In the case, detainees imprisoned without charge under section 23 of the Anti-terrorism, Crime and Security Act 2001, on the grounds that they posed a threat to national security, appealed successfully against their detention. The court held that the powers of detention without charge had discriminatory impact (Articles 5 and 14 of the Human Rights Act 1998).

== United States ==
There are some examples of judicial deference in the United States, despite its entrenched constitution. For example, in immigration law, the judiciary has historically sought to allow the explicit constitutional authority of the US Congress. An example is US Supreme Court decision Fiallo v. Bell (1977).

The same restraint is requested in foreign affairs as not-judicable matters, to safeguard the executive branch.

== See also ==
- Major questions doctrine
- Business judgment rule
