= Burlingame Treaty =

1868 treaty between the United States and China

Burlingame–Seward Treaty of 1868
- Signed: July 28, 1868
- Location: Washington, D.C.
- Signatories: China United States
- Language: Chinese, English

The Burlingame Treaty (Chinese: 中美天津條約續增條款), also known as the Burlingame–Seward Treaty of 1868, and formally titled the Sino-American Treaty of Peace, Amity, and Commerce, was a landmark treaty between the United States and Qing China, amending the Treaty of Tientsin, to establish formal friendly relations between the two nations, with the United States granting China the status of most favored nation with regard to trade. It was signed in the capital of the United States, Washington, D.C. in 1868 and ratified in the Chinese capital, Peking in 1869. The most significant result of the treaty was that it effectively lifted any former restrictions in regards to emigration to the United States from China, leading to large-scale immigration to the United States beginning in earnest by Chinese immigrants.

== History ==
China and the United States concluded the Burlingame–Seward Treaty in 1868 to expand upon the Treaty of Tientsin of 1858. The new treaty established some basic principles that aimed to ease immigration restrictions and represented a Chinese effort to limit foreign interference in internal Chinese affairs.

On June 14, 1861, president Abraham Lincoln appointed Anson Burlingame as minister to the Qing Empire. Burlingame was an inexperienced diplomat, but a resolute anti-slavery advocate in Congress who had lost his seat in the House while stumping for Lincoln. Upon his arrival in China, he chose to establish a cooperative and friendly diplomatic policy rather than an aggressive and uncompromising one and developed close and amicable relationships with the reform elements of the Qing court.

The United States also wished to gain access to profitable trading opportunities and foster the continued spread of Christianity in Asia by missionaries, which had already been initiated by Catholic missionaries who arrived in China starting in the 16th century. As a part of the general effort to convince the Chinese to adopt a more Western approach to diplomacy and governance, the Western powers also encouraged the Qing government to send diplomatic missions abroad. Finally persuaded to do so, the Chinese requested that Burlingame accompany their representatives on a tour that included stops in the major capitals of Washington, London, Paris, and Berlin. Burlingame, originally a representative of the U.S. government, gave up his post to assist the Chinese in their treaty negotiations with Secretary of State William H. Seward.

While in Washington, Burlingame negotiated a treaty with Seward, his former superior, to revise and expand upon the points established in the Treaty of Tientsin of 1858. The first several articles of the new treaty protected commerce conducted in Chinese ports and cities, and established the right of China to appoint consuls to American port cities. The more groundbreaking articles included measures that promised the Chinese the right to free immigration and travel within the United States and allowed for the protection of Chinese citizens in the United States in accordance with the most-favored-nation principle. Another article gave the citizens of the two nations reciprocal access to education and schooling when living in the other country. All of these articles served to reinforce the principle of equality between the two nations.

The final article of the Burlingame–Seward Treaty offered China some protection from external influence in internal matters. In this article, the U.S. recognized that the decision to begin new construction projects or similar improvements belonged in the hands of the local government, not foreign powers or their representatives. This point was intended to safeguard against undue U.S. involvement in Chinese domestic affairs.

On November 16, 1867, Burlingame was appointed envoy extraordinary and minister plenipotentiary to head a Chinese diplomatic mission to the United States and the principal European nations. The mission, which included two Chinese ministers, two Western secretaries, six students from Peking, and a considerable retinue, arrived in the United States in March 1868. Burlingame used his personal relations with the Republican administration to negotiate a relatively quick and favorable treaty. In a series of speeches across the country, he displayed eloquent oratory to advocate equal treatment of China and a welcoming stance toward Chinese immigrants. On July 28, 1868, the mission concluded at Washington a series of articles, supplementary to the Reed Treaty of 1858, later known as the Burlingame Treaty.

== Terms ==
The treaty's formal title was the Sino-American Treaty of Peace, Amity, and Commerce.

The treaty:

- Recognized China's right of eminent domain over all of its territory;
- Gave China the right to appoint consuls at ports in the United States, "who shall enjoy the same privileges and immunities as those enjoyed by the consuls of Great Britain and Russia";
- Provided that "citizens of the United States in China of every religious persuasion and Chinese subjects in the United States shall enjoy entire liberty of conscience and shall be exempt from all disability or persecution on account of their religious faith or worship in either country"; and
- Granted certain privileges to citizens of either country residing in the other, the privilege of naturalization, however, being specifically withheld. It stated in Article 6:

Citizens of the United States visiting or residing in China shall enjoy the same privileges, immunities or exemptions in respect to travel or residence there as may be enjoyed by the citizens or subjects of the most favored nation, and, reciprocally, Chinese subjects visiting or residing in the United States, shall enjoy the same privileges, immunities and exemptions in respect to travel or residence there as may be enjoyed by the citizens or subjects of the most favored nation. But nothing herein contained shall be held to confer naturalization on the citizens of the United States in China, nor upon the subjects of China in the United States.

== Impact ==
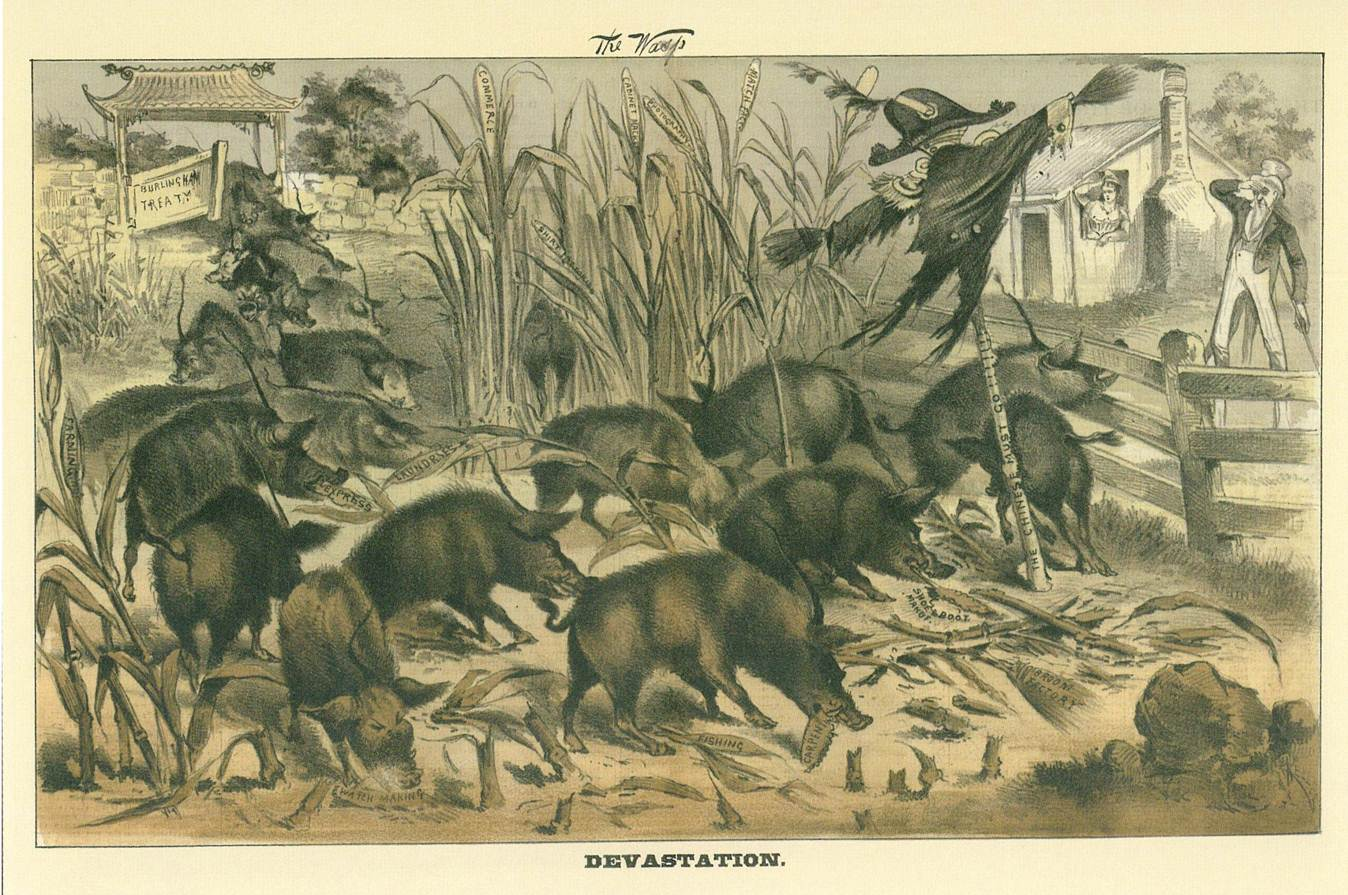
Anti-Chinese cartoon from The Wasp: Chinese immigrants, depicted as pigs, bursting through a gate labeled "Burlingham Treaty" and ravaging a field of crops representing industries while Uncle Sam and Columbia watch. A tattered scarecrow represents anti-Chinese labor leader Denis Kearney.

The treaty was the first equal treaty between China and the United States.

The treaty provision providing Chinese in the United States the same rights as other foreigners allowed Chinese to enroll in American schools and universities. In turn, this facilitated China's first central-government sponsored study abroad program, the Chinese Educational Mission.

Chinese immigration to the United States was initially encouraged. Despite the reciprocal protections that the treaty afforded Chinese in the United States and Americans in China, the treaty ultimately reinforced U.S. trade interests with China under the principle of the most-favored-nation concept, and it ensured a steady flow of low-cost Chinese immigrant labor for U.S. firms. For these reasons, American industrial leaders initially celebrated the treaty as a major advancement for American commercial interests.

However, the success of the treaty was short-lived. By the late 1870s, U.S. industrial leaders and politicians could no longer ignore the increasing anti-Chinese sentiment and violence in the United States, particularly in the western states; in fact, industrialists and politicians often promoted anti-Chinese activities.

Opposition to Chinese immigration in Congress led President Rutherford B. Hayes to authorize James Burrill Angell to renegotiate the treaty in 1880. On November 17, 1880, the renegotiated/revised treaty, called the Treaty Regulating Immigration from China (and more informally as the Angell Treaty of 1880), was passed. This would suspend, but not prohibit, Chinese immigration, while confirming the obligation of the United States to protect the rights of those immigrants already in the U.S. The subsequent passage of the Chinese Exclusion Act of 1882 abrogated its free immigration clauses altogether.

== See also ==
- Anson Burlingame
- William H. Seward
- List of treaties
- Timeline of United States diplomatic history
- Chinese American
