= Kleindienst v. Mandel =

- Supreme Court of the United States

Argued April 18, 1972 Decided June 29, 1972
- Full case name: Richard Gordon Kleindienst, Attorney General, et al. v. Ernest Mandel, et al.
- Citations: 408 U.S. 753 (more) 92 S.Ct. 2576; 33 L. Ed. 2d 683; 1972 U.S. LEXIS 22

Case history
- Prior: Appeal from the United States District Court for the Eastern District of New York

Holding
- American citizens have standing to challenge ideological exclusions of non-citizens when those exclusions burden their First Amendment right to receive information. However, the government’s decision to deny a visa is not subject to traditional strict scrutiny. Instead, it need only provide a “facially legitimate and bona fide reason” for the exclusion. The Court has applied this highly deferential standard in light of its view that “plenary congressional power to make policies and rules for exclusion of aliens has long been firmly established,” and that Congress has delegated broad discretion over exclusion decisions to the Executive Branch.

Court membership
- Chief Justice Warren E. Burger Associate Justices William O. Douglas · William J. Brennan Jr. Potter Stewart · Byron White; Thurgood Marshall · Harry Blackmun; Lewis F. Powell Jr. · William Rehnquist

Case opinions
- Majority: Blackmun, joined by Burger, Stewart, White, Powell, Rehnquist
- Dissent: Douglas
- Dissent: Marshall, joined by Brennan

Laws applied
- Immigration and Nationality Act of 1952, § 212(a)(28)

Kleindienst v. Mandel, 408 U.S. 753 (1972), was a decision by the United States Supreme Court, which held that the United States Attorney General has the right to refuse somebody's entry to the United States, as he has been empowered to do so in § 212(a)(28) of the Immigration and Nationality Act of 1952.

This action was brought to compel Attorney General Richard Kleindienst to grant a temporary nonimmigrant visa to a Belgian journalist and Marxian theoretician whom the American plaintiff-appellees, Ernest Mandel et al., had invited to participate in academic conferences and discussions in the US. The alien had been found ineligible for admission under §§ 212(a)(28)(D) and (G)(v) of the Immigration and Nationality Act of 1952, barring those who advocate or publish "the economic, international, and governmental doctrines of world communism." Kleindienst had declined to waive ineligibility as he has the power to do under § 212(d) of the Act, basing his decision on unscheduled activities engaged in by the alien on a previous visit to the United States, when a waiver was granted.

== Background ==
Ernest Mandel was raised in a secular Jewish family in Antwerp, Belgium. During World War II, he joined the Belgian resistance and was arrested during the German occupation of Belgium for distributing anti-fascist literature to German soldiers. He was deported from Belgium and held in labor camps until they were liberated by American forces in 1944. After the war, Mandel continued to advocate revolutionary socialist ideas and twice visited the United States during the 1960s to speak at campus events organized by student protest movements.

In 1969, Mandel's visa application was denied and he was informed that he was barred from entry under the McCarran–Walter Act. His earlier visits in 1962 and 1968 had been permitted under a statutory waiver provision, but after Richard Nixon was elected president in 1968, no waiver was granted. The Act did not require the government to provide a reason for exclusion. Attorney General John N. Mitchell told reporters, "I don't think we need to import any more trouble than we have" and that it would be "most appropriate that [Mandel] ... not return to this country to carry out some of the activities he did on his previous trips." James F. Greene, an associate commissioner of the Immigration and Naturalization Service, alleged that Mandel had helped incite student and labor unrest in France and had abused the opportunities afforded to him to express his views in the United States by associating with individuals and organizations dedicated to violence and the overthrow of existing political and social institutions. Critics, however, viewed Mandel's exclusion as part of the Nixon administration's intolerance of dissent and compared it to McCarthyism.

Represented by Leonard Boudin, Mandel filed suit in the United States District Court for the Eastern District of New York. In light of the Supreme Court's earlier decision in Turner v. Williams (1904), which held that non-citizens seeking entry to the United States could not challenge their exclusion on First Amendment grounds, Boudin argued that excluding an invited scholar amounted to censorship that infringed the First Amendment right of Americans to receive information recognized in Lamont v. Postmaster General (1965). American scholars including Norman Birnbaum, Robert Heilbroner, Wassily Leontief, and Robert Paul Wolff joined the suit as plaintiffs.

== Supreme Court ==
The Supreme Court held that American citizens have standing to challenge ideological exclusions that burden their First Amendment right to receive information, but afforded that right little protection, applying a highly deferential standard under which the government needed only to provide a "facially legitimate" reason for the exclusion.

== Impact ==
Kleindienst v. Mandel was cited by the 9th Circuit three-judge appeals panel on February 9, 2017, in Washington v. Trump, with regard to an executive order concerning the restriction of immigration from certain stipulated countries. In that case the government relied on language from Mandel that embraces the proposition that "when the Executive exercises immigration authority 'on the basis of a facially legitimate and bona fide reason, the courts will [not] look behind the exercise of that discretion.'" The court instead held that the Mandel standard involved a "congressionally enumerated standard" and its application to an individual visa application rather than what it considered to be the "President's promulgation of sweeping immigration policy". They concluded that "courts can and do review constitutional challenges to the substance and implementation of immigration policy."

The Supreme Court in Trump v. Hawaii (2018) later relied in part on Kleindienst v. Mandel, overruling the 9th Circuit, to uphold executive orders of the First Trump Administration that restricted certain foreign nationals from entering the United States.

== See also ==
- List of United States Supreme Court cases, volume 408
