= Plenary power =

Power to act without limitations

In law, a plenary power or plenary authority, derived from the Latin term plenus, 'full', is a complete and exclusive power over a particular subject matter, with no or minimal substantive limitations, and without needing additional authorization.

== United States ==
=== Immigration and nationality ===
Congress and the President have plenary power to make and enforce immigration and nationality policy, with limited judicial review. This power is foregrounded in the "ancient principles of the international law of nation-states", or Ius gentium principles, that immigration and nationality laws are matters of sovereignty; that immigration and naturalization are privileges that exist at the pleasure of the people; and that immigration and nationality laws involve political questions best left to the people. Though this power was largely unused until the 1880s, the underlying principles behind it trace as far back as the Roman Empire and were embraced by Founding Fathers such as Gouverneur Morris, who is quoted as stating: "Every society, from a great nation down to a club, had the right of declaring the conditions on which new members should be admitted." The textual basis of this lies in the foreign affairs powers under the commerce, naturalization, define and punish, and war clauses of the Constitution.

=== Indian tribes ===
Congress has power over Indian affairs under article I, section 8, clause 3 of the Constitution, or the Commerce Clause: "To regulate Commerce with foreign Nations, and among the several States, and with the Indian Tribes." The scope of this power is plenary and works to the exclusion of states or tribes, with Congress even able to de-establish a tribe itself. Many tribal leaders view this power over their affairs as "tyrannical," since it inhibits tribal self-governance and subjects tribes to outside forces in Congress. This breadth of Congressional involvement in tribal affairs has been described as rooted in the Vanishing Indian myth. Critics describe its use as "inappropriate and unconstitutional" because it undermines Tribal sovereignty and enhances state invasions into Tribal governance."

=== Postal system ===
Congress has power over the postal system under article I, section 8, clause 7, or the Postal Clause: "To establish Post Offices and post Roads." The scope of this power is plenary and is not affected by federalism concerns under the Tenth Amendment.

=== Pardons ===
The power of federal pardons in the United States is a plenary power.

== See also ==
- Judicial deference – Act of a judiciary deferring to another branch of government
- Plenipotentiary – Diplomat with full powers
- Political question – Legal doctrine of political matters' justiciability
