= Deportation from the United States =

Process of expelling foreigners from the United States

Official data on voluntary departures (returns), formal deportations (removals), and Title 42 expulsions from the United States, 1892–2022

As a percentage of the U.S. population

Deportation from the United States is the process of expelling foreigners. Deportation distinguishes between two primary models: "extended border control", which involves expelling foreigners for violations related to their admission, and "post-entry social control", which targets individuals for conduct, such as criminal activity, that occurs after admission to the country. Between 1920 and 2018, the U.S. expelled nearly 57 million people, more than any other country in the world, and more than it allowed to immigrate legally.

Deportation has historically used three primary mechanisms of expulsion: formal deportation (removals), voluntary departure, and self-deportation. Formal deportations, which carry legal penalties for reentry, account for a minority of expulsions. The vast majority have occurred through voluntary departure, an administrative process in which law enforcement coerces or incentivizes apprehended individuals into leaving the country. Self-deportation occurs when migrants leave on their own accord, although this is often influenced by fear, intimidation, and law enforcement activity that makes it difficult to remain.

Federal deportation policy developed from early colonial practices, the 1798 Alien and Sedition Acts, and the late 19th-century anti-Chinese movement. While deportation historically implicated largely Chinese and European persons, since the Immigration and Nationality Act of 1965, Mexicans have accounted for about 90 percent of all deportees. The deportation process has been shaped by a complex interplay of bureaucratic imperatives, profit motives, ethnic prejudice, and political calculations, with impacts for individuals, families, and communities.

== History ==
=== Colonial Era to mid 19th century policies ===
The modern U.S. deportation system was built upon a long history of exclusion and expulsion that predates the federal government. English colonial authorities in North America adapted practices from the British, such as laws for the transportation of convicts and the "warning out" systems used to control the movement of the poor. The first major deportation of European settlers occurred in the 1750s, when the British expelled some 8,000 Acadians from what is now Nova Scotia.

After independence, the first federal law authorizing the expulsion of foreigners was the Alien Friends Act of 1798. The law gave the president discretionary power to deport any foreigner he deemed "dangerous to the peace and safety of the United States". Though never formally enforced, the Act prompted a fierce debate over federal power, states' rights, and the constitutional protections afforded to foreigners, with figures like Thomas Jefferson and James Madison arguing that it was unconstitutional. The Alien Friends Act expired in 1800, but was followed by the Alien Enemies Act, which affords the President "very great discretionary powers" to expel foreigners and which has "remained the law of the land, virtually unchanged since 1798."

=== Chinese exclusion and late 19th century policies ===
State governments had the authority to banish people, a power they used to remove groups like Irish Catholics and paupers. This system of local control began to change with the rise of the anti-Chinese movement.

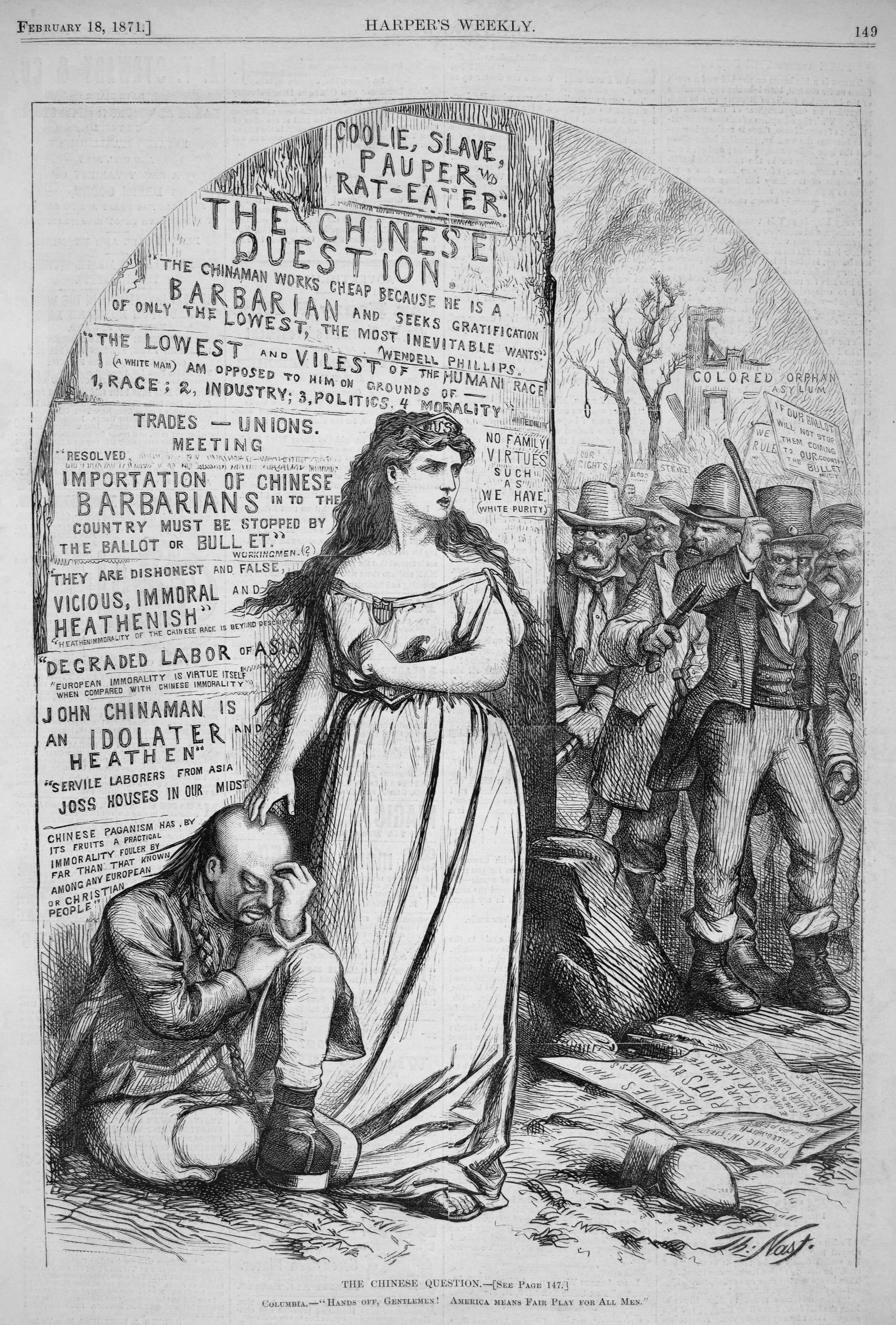
An 1871 Thomas Nast cartoon depicting negative stereotypes of Chinese immigrants. Anti-Chinese sentiment drove the development of early US deportation policy.

Chinese migrants first arrived in large numbers during the California Gold Rush of the 1850s, providing labor for railroads, mines, and other industries in the American West. By 1880, over 105,000 Chinese people lived in the United States. Many white Americans, particularly in California, however, viewed the growing Chinese population as an existential threat, a "heathen" and "uncivilized" race that was incapable of assimilation. In response to sustained political pressure from nativist groups like the Workingmen's Party of California, Congress passed the Page Act of 1875, which barred the admission of anyone from Asia who was involved in forced labor or prostitution and anyone from anywhere in the world who was convicted of a criminal offense in their country of origin.

Between 1885 and 1886, at least 168 communities in the American West carried out campaigns to drive out their Chinese residents. In Truckee, California, community leaders including newspaper editor Charles Fayette McGlashan, used boycotts of anyone who employed or patronized Chinese residents, combined with the use of intimidation, threats, and violence, to drive out the town's Chinese population. These campaigns coerced an estimated 15,000 or more Chinese people out of communities or the country.

In 1882, Congress passed the Chinese Exclusion Act, which barred the admission of Chinese laborers for ten years. In addition, Congress passed the Immigration Act of 1882, which introduced a head tax to be collected from each arriving immigrant and also barred from admission to the United States, persons with disabilities and those deemed a public charge. The Immigration Act of 1882 was subsequently challenged in the Head Money Cases (1884), where a Dutch shipping company argued that the law was beyond federal power and in conflict with then-existing United States treaty obligations; ultimately, the Supreme Court upheld the law, concluding Congress had the power to impose immigration-related fees and to abrogate prior treaties. Building on this judicial acceptance of treaty abrogation in matters of immigration and foreign affairs, Congress passed the Scott Act of 1888, which abrogated the Burlingame Treaty of 1868 and barred the re-entry of Chinese laborers previously admitted under the Chinese Exclusion Act, voiding the over 20,000 outstanding re-entry permits which had been issued to Chinese laborers under 1884 amendments to the Chinese Exclusion Act. In Chae Chan Ping v. United States (1889), the Supreme Court upheld the Scott Act of 1888. In 1892, Congress passed the Geary Act, which extended the Chinese Exclusion Act for ten years and required Chinese persons to obtain residency permits, with deportation for non-registration. Chinese immigrants in the United States organized protests and brought legal challenges. In Fong Yue Ting v. United States (1893), which was a challenge to the Geary Act, the Supreme Court held that deportation is a civil procedure, which limited procedural protections for deportees.

=== Federal bureaucracy and early expulsions (1891–1924) ===
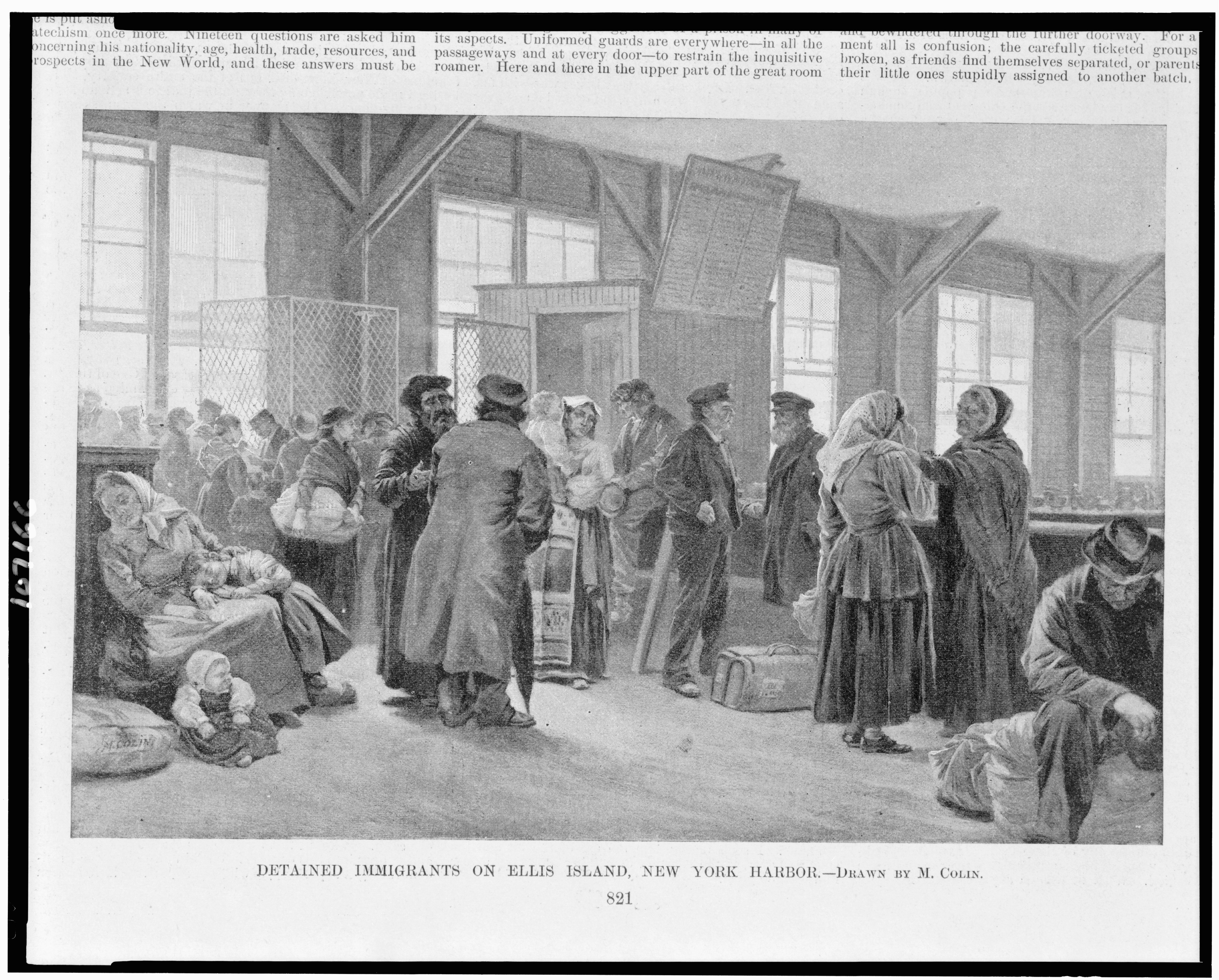
Depiction of immigrants awaiting deportation on Ellis Island, 1893

The Immigration Act of 1891 furthered the federalization of deportation by creating a new superintendent of immigration within the Department of the Treasury. The law expanded the category of inadmissible or removable foreigners to include people with contagious diseases and polygamists. The act also provided for the administrative finality of admissibility decisions by immigration officials, a provision which was upheld a year later in Nishimura Ekiu v. United States (1892). Over the next two decades, the grounds for inadmissibility or deportation would expand beyond ethnic or economic grounds to further encompass ideological and other social grounds. Following the assassination of President McKinley by Polish-American anarchist Leon Czolgosz, Congress passed and President Theodore Roosevelt signed, the Anarchist Exclusion Act of 1903. In United States ex rel. Turner v. Williams (1904), the Supreme Court upheld this law against a challenge that had been brought by British anarchist John Turner, with Chief Justice Fuller's citing "self-preservation" as the reason that the Anarchist Exclusion Act was sustained. The Immigration Act of 1917 expanded the grounds for inadmissibility to include geographic grounds by establishing a "barred zone" that encompassed much of Asia.

During this period, formal deportation was a cumbersome and expensive process. This led immigration officials to develop what is now termed voluntary departure, a process where a foreigner agrees to waive participation in the deportation process and instead departs the United States on their own accord. Though not officially tracked by the government until 1927, archival records show that officials relied on voluntary departure as early as 1907. It proved an expeditious and cost-effective tool, particularly along the southern border, where it was easier to turn foreigners around, heading back to Mexico, than it was for the government to transport them. Between 1918 and 1921, as immigration from Mexico increased, so did voluntary departures During this period, federal authorities carried out nearly 20,000 voluntary departures of Mexicans, more than three times the number of formal deportations of all other nationalities combined. By the late 1910s, the typical deportee was a Mexican who had entered the country without inspection.

=== Johnson-Reed Era (1924–1965) ===
The Immigration Act of 1924, or Johnson-Reed Act, altered the landscape of U.S. immigration and deportation. The act established the national origins quota formula that restricted immigration from Southern Europe, Eastern Europe, and Asia, with exception of the Philippines, which was under U.S. control at that time, but placed no numerical limits on immigration from the Americas. Before 1924, immigration restrictions were primarily qualitative in nature, with restrictions on prostitutes and convicts (Page Act of 1875), public charges (Immigration Act of 1882), Chinese persons (Chinese Exclusion Act of 1882 and follow-up legislation), anarchists (Anarchist Exclusion Act of 1903), and so on. The 1924 Act, with its quantitative restrictions, expanded the category of illegal immigration to larger groups of people, who became subject to deportation by overstaying or entering without a quota visa. This new legal framework, combined with increased enforcement along the U.S.–Mexico border and the establishment of the U.S. Border Patrol, laid the groundwork for deportation campaigns the following decades.

==== Great Depression and repatriation ====
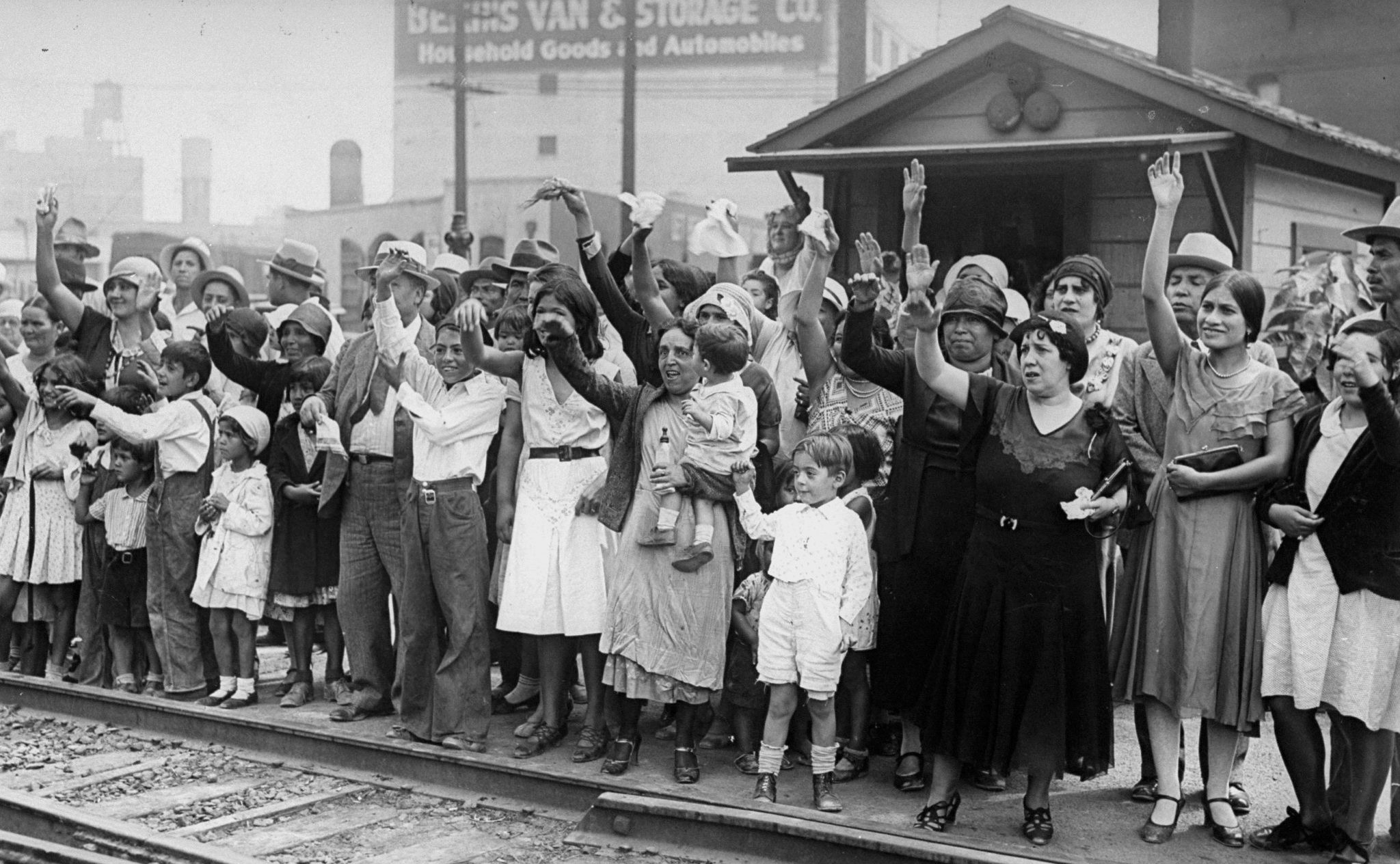
Relatives and friends wave goodbye to a train carrying 1,500 persons being expelled from Los Angeles back to Mexico, 1931.

The Great Depression led to a rise in anti-immigrant sentiment, with widespread scapegoating of Mexicans for economic woes. In response, federal, state, and local officials launched large-scale self-deportation campaigns, known as the Mexican Repatriation, to pressure Mexicans and Mexican Americans to leave the country. William N. Doak, the Secretary of Labor under President Herbert Hoover, orchestrated a national campaign, using immigration raids on homes, workplaces, and public spaces to create a "gladiatorial spectacle" of "alien hunting". In Los Angeles, officials announced raids in major English- and Spanish-language newspapers to "scare many thousand alien deportables" into leaving. These tactics, which relied on rumors, intimidation, and police cooperation, were effective. Between 1929 and 1939, as many as half a million Mexicans and Mexican Americans were repatriated, with a majority leaving through self-deportation or voluntary departure.

==== Bracero Program and Operation Wetback ====
After World War II, the demand for cheap agricultural labor led to the creation of the Bracero Program (1942–1964), a series of binational agreements that brought millions of Mexican men to the United States as temporary guest workers. The program, however, existed alongside and contributed to a rise in illegal immigration, creating what became known as the "wetback crisis" in the early 1950s. In 1954, the Eisenhower administration launched Operation Wetback, a military-style campaign by the Immigration and Naturalization Service (INS) designed to apprehend and expel Mexicans. Led by General Joseph M. Swing, the operation relied on a combination of raids, publicity campaigns, and large-scale expulsions to create a climate of fear.

While the operation involved formal deportations, more than one-million persons were processed by immigration officials through voluntary departures. The INS also contracted with Mexican shipping companies to transport persons from Port Isabel, Texas, across the Gulf of Mexico to Veracruz. The conditions on these ships, which were often repurposed cargo vessels, were abysmal, with departing Mexicans crowded into holds with little food, water, or sanitation. The journey, which could last up to forty-eight hours, was intended to traumatize and deter its passenger from re-entering the United States. This immigration enforcement operation inflicted severe physical and psychological hardship on the many Mexicans affected.

==== Cold War and ideological deportations ====
The post-war era and the rise of the Cold War saw a new wave of ideological deportations related to Communism. Building on prior legislation, the Internal Security Act of 1950 and the Immigration and Nationality Act of 1952 (McCarran-Walter Act) expanded the government's power to deport foreigners for their political beliefs and associations, including for past membership in the Communist Party. The Supreme Court upheld these laws in cases like Harisiades v. Shaughnessy (1952).

People whose deportation was sought on ideological grounds often attracted media attention, as the complex legal and logistical issues involved with their deportation produced frequent delays or setbacks on the part of the government. For instance, the government spent 14 years, from 1939 to 1953, attempting to deport Australian-born labor organizer Harry Bridges for his alleged Communist ties, a legal battle that involved multiple hearings, congressional action, and Supreme Court cases (Bridges v. Wixon (1945) and United States v. Bridges (1953)) before Bridges ultimately won. Another target was alleged mafia boss Carlos Marcello, whose case likewise illustrated the government's persistence, where after years of legal difficulties, Attorney General Robert F. Kennedy finally orchestrated Marcello's deportation to Guatemala in 1961, an act later criticized as a "kidnapping".

=== Hart-Celler Era (1965–present) ===
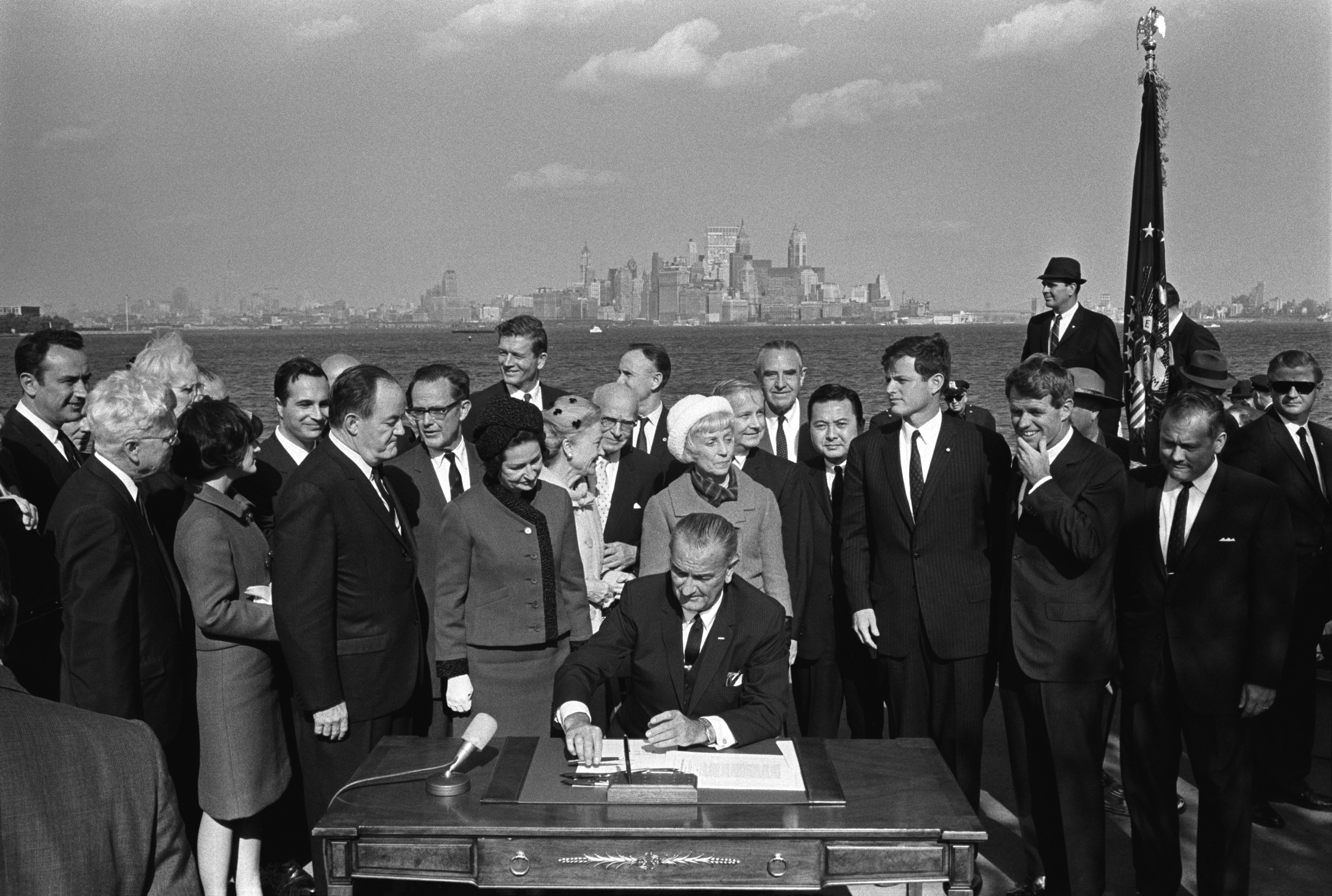
President Lyndon B. Johnson signing the Immigration and Nationality Act of 1965

The Immigration and Nationality Act of 1965 (Hart-Celler Act) marked a significant shift in U.S. immigration policy. It abolished the national origins quota system and replaced it with a system of preferences based on family relationships and job skills. The law also imposed a numerical cap on immigration from the Western Hemisphere for the first time. This new restriction, combined with the end of the Bracero Program, led to a dramatic increase in illegal immigration from Mexico. Between 1965 and 1985, the INS carried out nearly 13 million expulsions, with voluntary departures accounting for 97 percent of the total. Deportation in this period featured a "revolving door" cycle of detention and departure.

==== Immigrant rights movement ====
In response to rising deportations and what they saw as discriminatory enforcement, a new immigrant rights movement emerged in the 1970s. Led by organizations like CASA (Centro de Acción Social Autónomo) and supported by labor unions and the Catholic Church, the movement challenged the government by a combination of protest, litigation, and organizing. Activists conducted know-your-rights campaigns, distributing pamphlets that advised migrants on how to assert their constitutional rights, such as the right to remain silent and the right to an attorney. They also organized demonstrations, picket lines, and legal challenges to contest factory raids and the INS's use of racial profiling.

A landmark class-action lawsuit, Vallejo v. Sureck, filed after a 1978 raid on the Sbicca of California shoe factory, became a focal point of this resistance. The legal team, which included Peter Schey and Mark Rosenbaum, argued that the INS's practice of coercing migrants into signing voluntary departure forms without advising them of their rights was unconstitutional. The case, which took 14 years to resolve, resulted in a historic settlement in 1992 that required the INS to inform all apprehended individuals of their legal rights, including the right to a deportation hearing and the right to consult a lawyer.

==== 1980s to 1990s ====
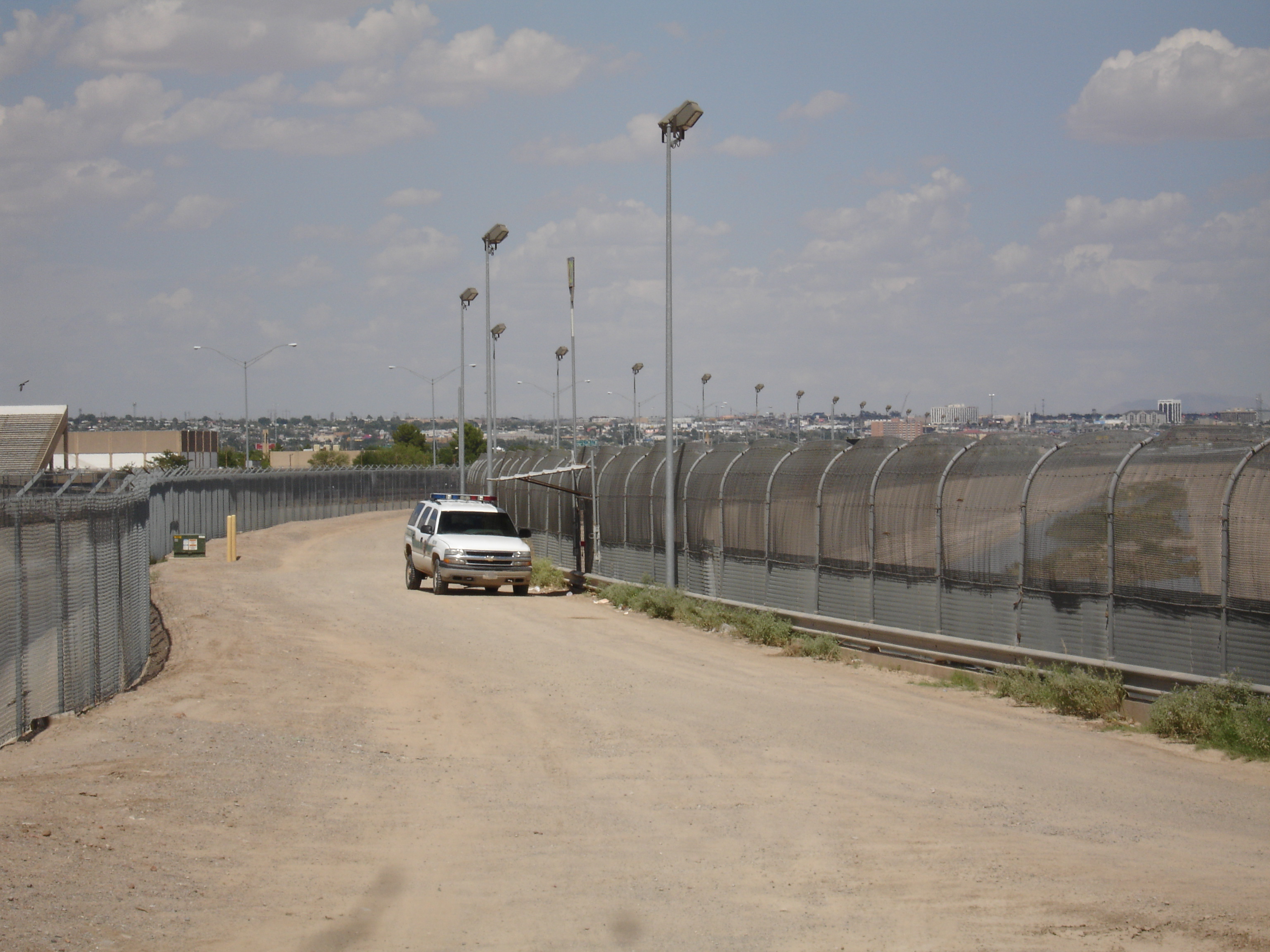
U.S.–Mexico border fence near El Paso, Texas, 2006

The passage of the Immigration Reform and Control Act of 1986 (IRCA) marked another turning point. While the law granted amnesty to nearly 3 million illegal immigrants, it also increased border enforcement and introduced employer sanctions for knowingly hiring unauthorized workers. This began a new era of militarization along the U.S.–Mexico border, with the construction of walls and fences and an increase in the size and budget of the Border Patrol. The Anti-Drug Abuse Act of 1988 created the legal term of art "aggravated felony", which makes a wide range of crimes, including some that are neither aggravated nor a felony, grounds for detention and deportation. The Illegal Immigration Reform and Immigrant Responsibility Act of 1996 (IIRAIRA) made major changes to United States immigration and nationality law, including creating the process of expedited removal, replacing the terms of art "entry" and "deportation" with "admission" and "removal" respectively, and limiting judicial review for final orders of removal.

The September 11 attacks in 2001 accelerated these trends, leading to the creation of the Department of Homeland Security (DHS) and the further conflation of immigration with national security. The USA PATRIOT Act expanded the government's surveillance powers and authority to detain foreigners indefinitely. The enforcement-first approach of the Bush administration resulted in policies like Operation Streamline, which mandated the criminal prosecution of individuals for unauthorized entry, and the Secure Fence Act of 2006, which authorized the construction of 700 miles of fencing along the border. The period also saw a boom in the private prison industry, which profited from the massive expansion of immigration detention. By 2016, corporations like CoreCivic and the GEO Group operated the majority of immigration detention beds and spent millions on lobbying for stricter enforcement policies.

The Obama administration continued many of these policies, expanding interior enforcement through the Secure Communities program, which linked local police databases to federal immigration databases. This led to a record number of formal removals, with nearly 3 million people deported during his presidency, earning him the moniker "deporter-in-chief" from some immigrant rights activists. The administration also oversaw the deportation of asylum seekers fleeing violence in Central America, a crisis fueled in part by past U.S. foreign policy in the region. In response to activist pressure, however, Obama also used executive action to create the Deferred Action for Childhood Arrivals (DACA) program in 2012, which provided temporary protection from deportation for hundreds of thousands of undocumented youth brought to the U.S. as children.

==== Trump administrations and "zero tolerance" ====
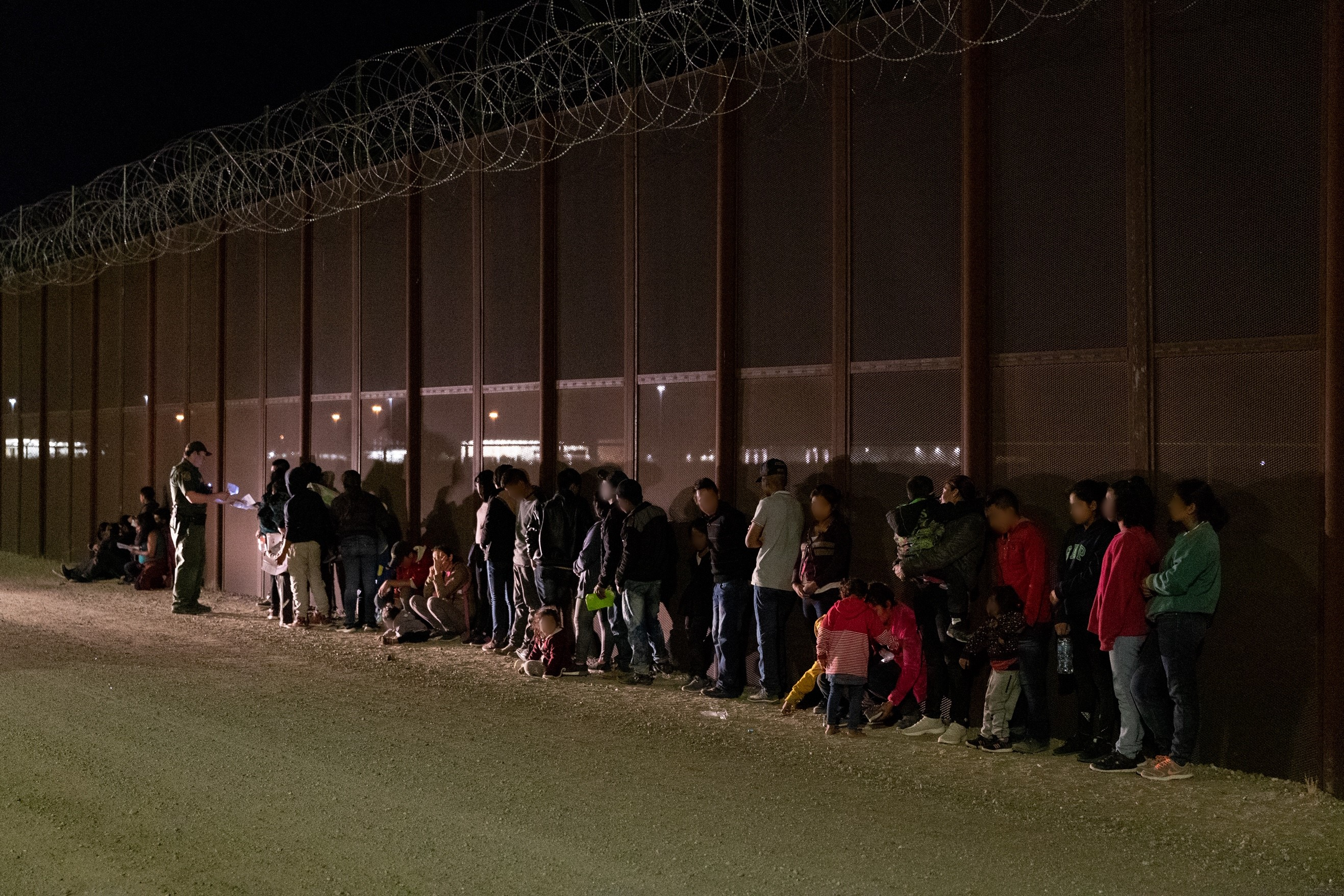
Large group of undocumented immigrants apprehended by Border Patrol near Yuma, Arizona, 2019

The first presidency of Donald Trump marked a radicalization of deportation policy. His administration deployed concerted fear campaigns and virulent anti-immigrant rhetoric to encourage self-deportation, a key plank of its enforcement strategy. Trump ended the Obama-era policy of prosecutorial discretion, making all undocumented immigrants a priority for removal. At the border, the administration implemented a "zero tolerance" policy, leading to the criminal prosecution of all adults who crossed without authorization and the systematic separation of thousands of children from their parents. The policy caused what the American Academy of Pediatrics called "irreparable harm" to children and created a humanitarian crisis. Although a federal court ordered the families to be reunited, the government had no effective system in place to do so, and many families remained separated.

The presidency of Joe Biden was marked by an initial reversal of his predecessor's policies, including the termination of the "Remain in Mexico" program and the halting of border wall construction. However, the administration continued to use the Title 42 public health authority invoked during the COVID-19 pandemic to carry out mass expulsions for over two years before the policy ended in May 2023. It was replaced by a new regulatory framework, the "Circumvention of Lawful Pathways" rule, which established a "rebuttable presumption of ineligibility" for asylum for most migrants who crossed the border without authorization after transiting through a third country. This new regime heavily relied on the use of the CBP One mobile application for migrants to schedule appointments at ports of entry, a system criticized for creating a "technological bordering" that presented significant barriers for vulnerable individuals. Amid sustained high levels of border crossings, the administration increasingly relied on externalizing enforcement to Mexico and, in June 2024, issued a sweeping executive order to suspend asylum processing when daily encounters exceeded a certain threshold, a move that critics noted was functionally similar to a previous Trump-era ban.

Upon taking office, the second Trump administration initiated a large-scale deportation operation. By September 2025, the administration reported that two million undocumented immigrants had departed the U.S., a figure comprising over 400,000 formal deportations and an estimated 1.6 million "self-deportations". To achieve this, the administration has utilized a wide range of law enforcement resources. U.S. Immigration and Customs Enforcement (ICE) began conducting raids in sanctuary cities in January 2025 and was authorized to operate in previously sensitive locations such as schools and hospitals. Thousands of federal agents from the FBI, DEA, and ATF were reassigned to support immigration enforcement. The 287(g) program, which deputizes state and local police to act as immigration agents, was also significantly expanded. The administration has broadened the role of the military and National Guard, deploying them to assist ICE with transportation and security. In a move that has drawn legal challenges, National Guard units from Republican-led states have been sent into Democratic-led states that are not cooperating with federal immigration policies.

To expedite removals, Trump invoked the Alien Enemies Act of 1798, targeting alleged members of the Venezuelan gang Tren de Aragua, which the administration designated a foreign terrorist organization. While the Supreme Court allowed the use of the act, it mandated that individuals must have the opportunity to legally challenge their deportation orders. To increase detention capacity, Trump ordered the expansion of the Migrant Operations Center at the Guantánamo Bay Naval Base to hold up to 30,000 "high-priority criminal aliens". As of September 2025, the number of migrants in ICE detention exceeded 59,000. On his first day in office, Trump signed an executive order to end birthright citizenship for children of foreigner parents, a policy that is currently facing legal challenges, with the administration petitioning the Supreme Court for a ruling. The administration is also reportedly exploring the denaturalization of some citizens. Additionally, the Laken Riley Act, signed on January 29, 2025, mandates the detention of immigrants charged with or convicted of certain crimes.

== Types of deportation ==
=== Formal deportation (removals) ===
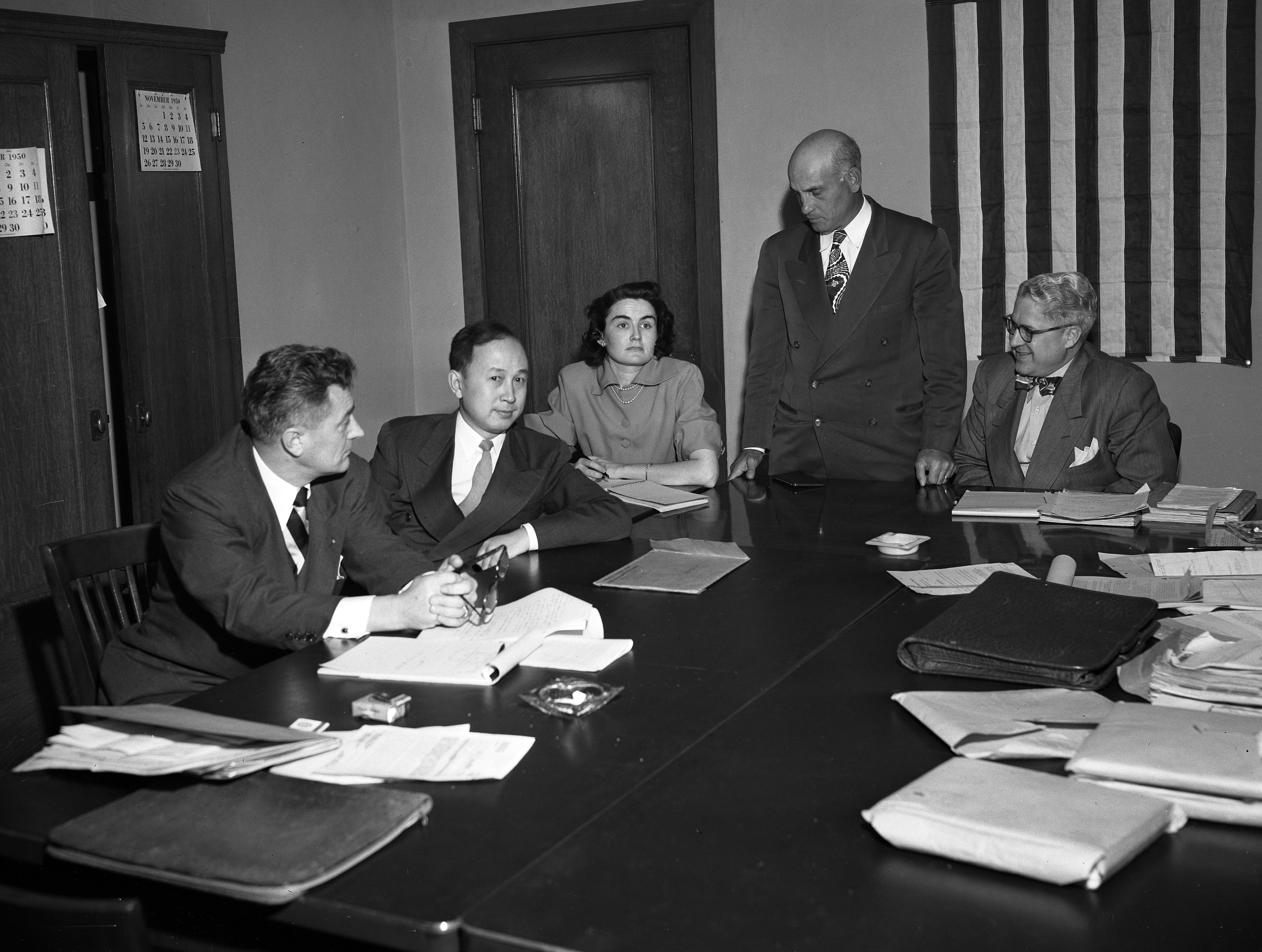
Deportation hearing for Chinese-born California Institute of Technology scientist Qian Xuesen, 1950

Formal deportation, or removal, as it has been termed since the Illegal Immigration Reform and Immigrant Responsibility Act of 1996, is the movement of a foreigner out of the United States in accordance with an administrative order of removal. The process has historically been cumbersome and usually began with an investigation by immigration officials, often based on tips from police, organizations, or individuals. If apprehended, a foreigner was scheduled to later appear before a board of special inquiry or an immigration judge. An order of removal is proven under the burden of "clear and convincing evidence" A final order of removal has collateral legal consequences, including bars on reentry.

In 1996, "expedited removal" was created, which occurs without a hearing and has limited judicial review. There also exists "reinstatement of removal" for those with prior removal orders; and "stipulated removal", which allows a judge to order removal without a hearing.

=== Voluntary departure ===
Voluntary departure, also known as "informal deportation" or "return", is the most common form of expulsion in U.S. history, accounting for 85 percent of the nearly 57 million expulsions between 1920 and 2018. It is a process in which an apprehended foreigner agrees to leave the country at their own expense, waiving their right to a formal removal hearing.

Immigration officials have long relied on voluntary departure as an alternative to formal deportation, since the process does not require that formal hearing be held. For the foreigner, agreeing to voluntary departure minimizes time spent in detention and avoids the legal bar on reentry associated with a final order of removal. This process became the primary tool for expelling Mexicans, particularly after the establishment of the Border Patrol in 1924, as it was easier to return someone across a land border than to ship them by water. By the 1950s, voluntary departures outnumbered formal deportations by a ratio of fifty-six to one.

=== Self-deportation ===
Self-deportation occurs when a foreigner leaves the United States on their own accord, although the decision is often influenced by factors that make remaining in the United States difficult. The immigration enforcement strategy of "attrition through enforcement" involves carrying out of immigration raids in such a manner as to also influence unapprehend foreigners to self-deport. An example of this at the legislative level was Arizona's SB 1070 in 2010, which its sponsors hoped would make life so miserable for illegal immigrants that they "self-deport".

== Operational machinery ==
=== Federal bureaucracy and discretionary power ===
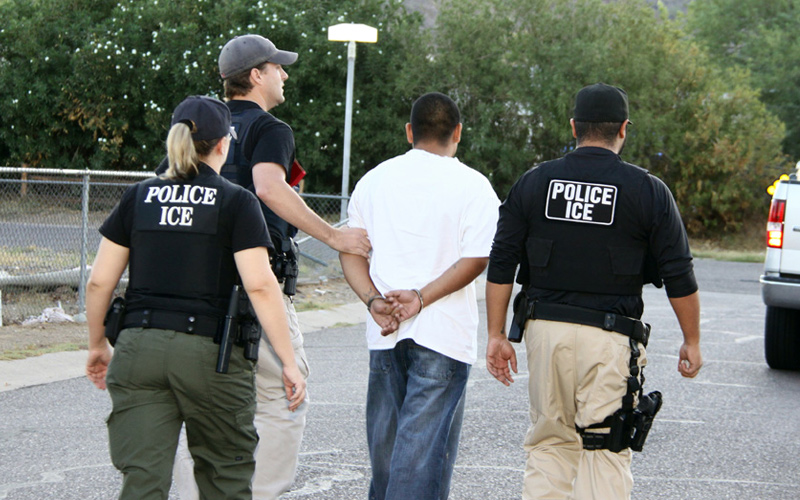
ICE agents arresting a man during Operation Cross Check, 2011

At the heart of the deportation machine is a federal bureaucracy that has grown in size and scope since its creation in 1891. Initially a small office within the Treasury Department (later transferred to the Commerce and Labor Department in 1903 and Labor Department in 1913), it evolved into the Immigration and Naturalization Service (INS) in 1933 and was later absorbed into the Department of Homeland Security (DHS) in 2003, with its enforcement functions split primarily between Immigration and Customs Enforcement (ICE) and Customs and Border Protection (CBP). Throughout its history, this bureaucracy has been granted tremendous discretionary power. Low-level officials have been empowered to act as "judge and jury", making unilateral decisions about who to expel, often through the coercive use of voluntary departure. This discretion has allowed officials on the ground to "shape ideas about what it meant to be American along the lines of race and class, politics and culture".

While high-level officials set policy and priorities, the day-to-day operation of the machine has often been driven by the actions of individual officers. In the early 20th century, inspectors in the field made ad-hoc decisions about whether to offer voluntary departure, weighing bureaucratic efficiency against the legal requirement for formal hearings. This "prosecutorial discretion" remains a central feature of the system, allowing officials to make choices about whom to target, what charges to bring, and what form of expulsion to use.

=== Cooperation with local and private actors ===
In the early 20th century, the Bureau of Immigration received tips from local police, hospitals, and charitable organizations to identify individuals for deportation. During the mass expulsion campaigns of the Great Depression and Operation Wetback, local police departments and sheriff's offices actively participated in immigration raids. This collaboration has been formalized in the contemporary era through programs like Secure Communities and 287(g) agreements, which deputize local law enforcement to act as immigration agents and link local police databases with federal immigration databases.

Private industry has also played a crucial and profitable role. In the late 19th and early 20th centuries, shipping companies, which had profited from transporting migrants to the United States, also contracted with the government to transport deportees. This "business of deportation" expanded to include railroads, bus lines, and eventually, private airlines. This profit motive has continued into the 21st century with the rise of the private prison industry. Corporations like CoreCivic and the GEO Group operate the majority of immigration detention facilities in the United States, spending millions on lobbying for stricter enforcement policies that ensure a steady flow of detainees.

=== Detention and transportation ===
During Donald Trump’s first year back in office, the monthly rate of ICE deportion flights more than doubled, and increased to 79 countries compared with 45 during Joe Biden's final year. Destination countries included many outside the Western hemisphere, some of them to African and Asian countries that had reportedly never received such flights in recent history.

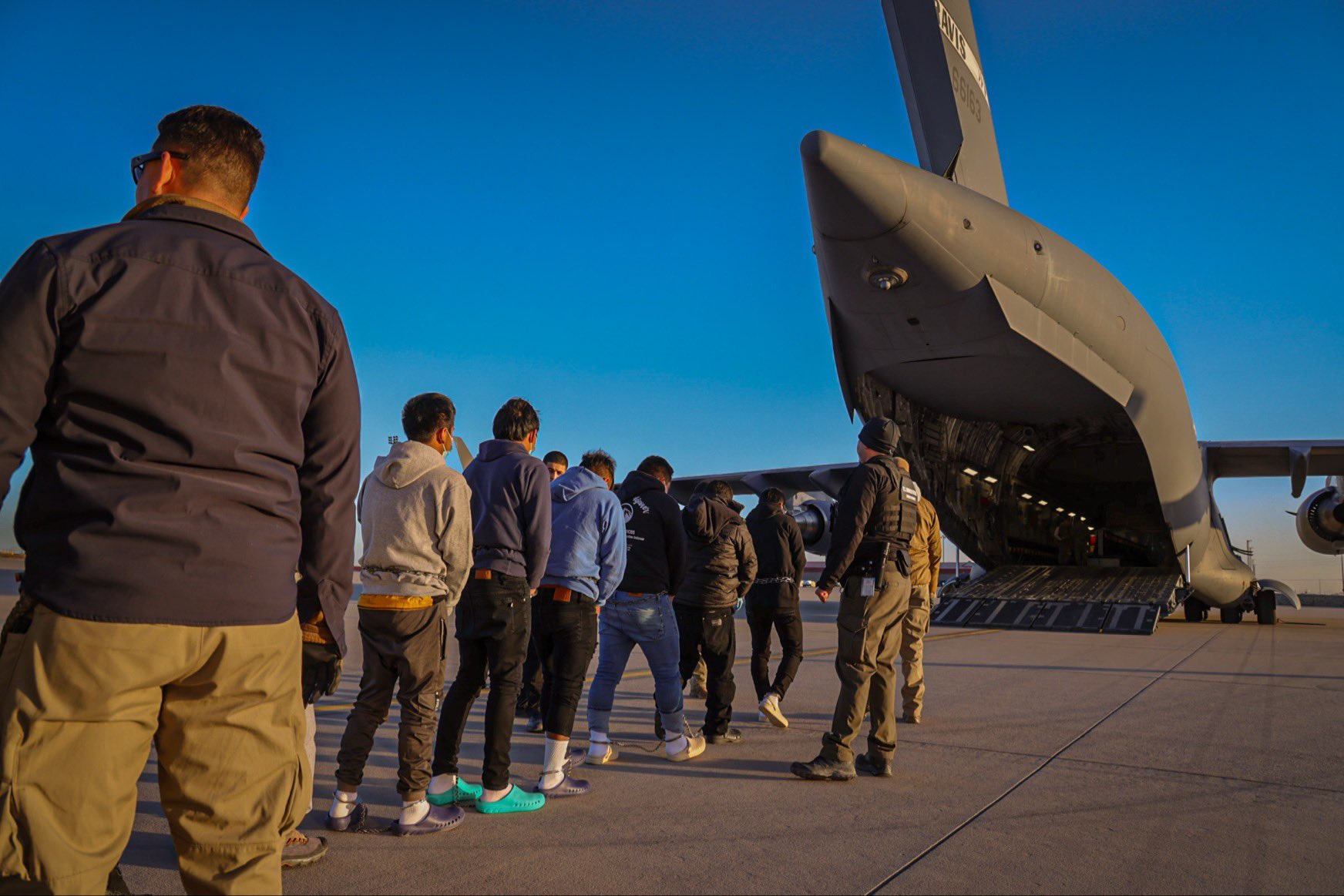
Immigrants boarding a deportation flight operated by a U.S. Air Force Boeing C-17 Globemaster III, 2025

The physical process of deportation involves a vast infrastructure of detention and transportation. Early in the 20th century, immigration authorities used "floating detention facilities", holding migrants on the ships that brought them to the United States while their cases were being decided. This was supplemented by the construction of large, federally-run immigration stations like Angel Island and Ellis Island, which served as both processing centers and detention facilities. In the interior, the INS has historically relied on a network of federal facilities, local jails, and, increasingly, privately owned prisons to detain individuals awaiting expulsion.

The transportation of deportees has been a massive logistical operation. In the early 20th century, officials used a network of cross-country "deportation trains" to move foreigners from the interior to coastal ports. For expulsions to Mexico, the government has used buses, trains, and, beginning in the 1940s, airplanes. The most infamous of these transportation methods was the boatlift of the 1950s, which transported hundreds of thousands of Mexicans from Texas to Veracruz on repurposed cargo ships. This practice treated human beings as "cargo", prioritizing profit and punishment over their safety and well-being. In the contemporary era, the government uses a combination of chartered planes and commercial flights to carry out removals, a system that has been described as a "page from a commercial carrier's in-flight magazine" due to its extensive network of domestic and international routes.

=== Technology and surveillance ===
Technology has been integral to the expansion and standardization of the deportation machine. Early in its history, the Bureau of Immigration adopted photography and fingerprinting to identify and track foreigners. During raids, agents have used surveillance photographs and hand-drawn maps to plan and execute their operations.

In the late 20th and early 21st centuries, the development of vast digital databases has revolutionized immigration enforcement. The creation of shared, biometric databases allows for the near-instantaneous identification of foreigners who have had any prior contact with immigration or law enforcement authorities. This technological integration, a key component of programs like Secure Communities, has effectively blurred the lines between criminal and immigration enforcement, turning routine police encounters into potential gateways to deportation.

== Social effects ==
Deportation has wide-ranging and profound effects on individuals, families, and communities, both in the United States and in the countries to which people are sent.

=== On individuals ===
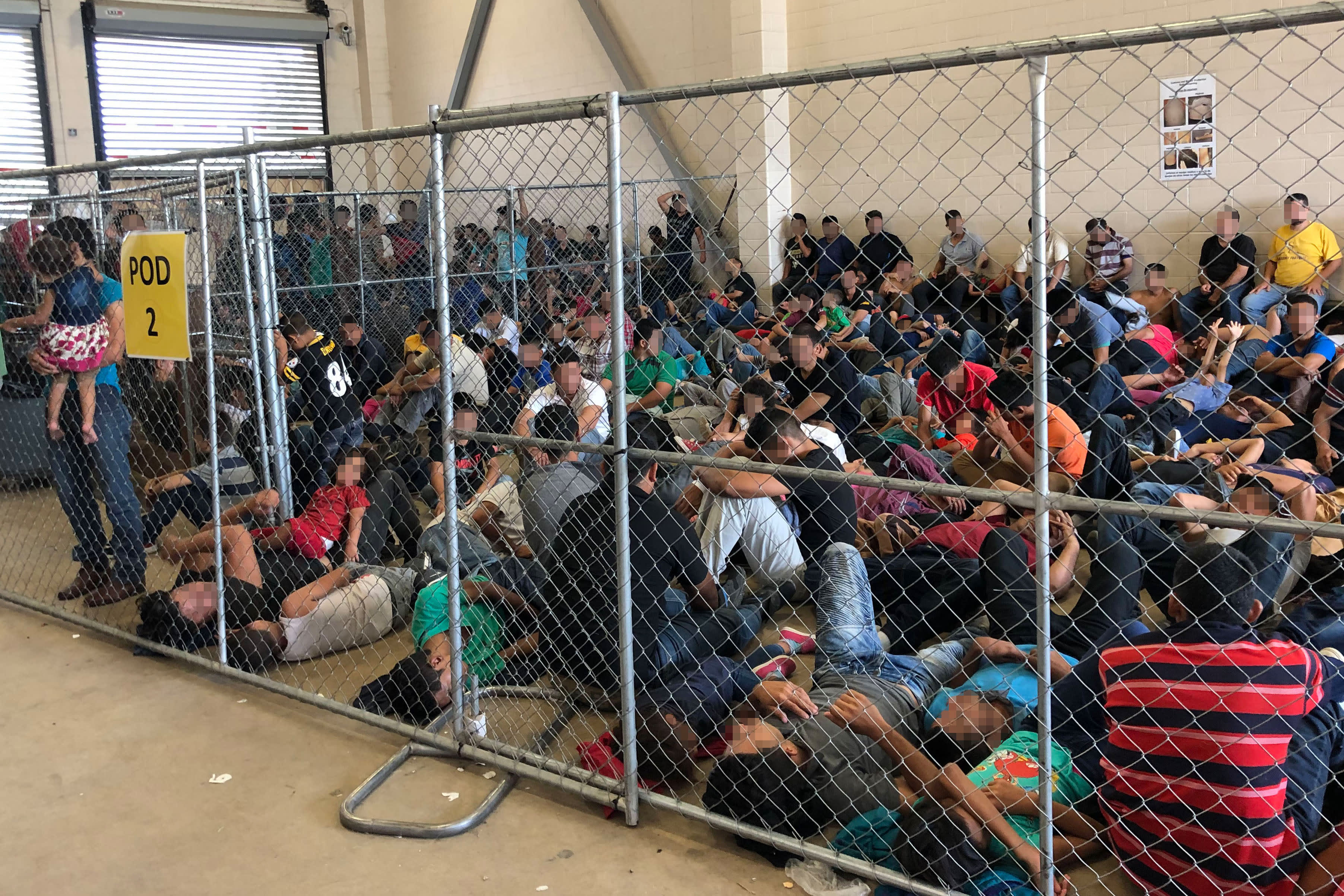
Overcrowded holding area at the U.S. Border Patrol's McAllen Station in McAllen, Texas, 2019

The deportation experience often begins with a period in immigration detention, which many deportees describe as demeaning, stressful, and dangerous. Unlike in the criminal justice system, where detention is a prelude to a trial, immigration detention is often indefinite, with no clear end date. Detainees are not serving time for a crime but are held to ensure their eventual expulsion. Conditions in these facilities, which include a mix of federal centers, county jails, and privately owned prisons, are often worse than in prisons. Detainees report inadequate food, a lack of recreation, and overcrowding. Immigration activists and detainees refer to some detention centers as "iceboxes" due to the constant, freezing temperatures, which they say are used to pressure detainees into agreeing to deportation. The uncertainty of their situation and the harsh conditions of confinement create prolonged stress and lead many to abandon their legal appeals.

Upon release and return to their country of origin, many deportees experience a profound sense of loss and dislocation. This is particularly true for those who grew up in the United States and have few or no connections to their country of birth. They often describe themselves as feeling like foreigners in their own homeland, struggling with cultural differences, language barriers, and a lack of social networks. The inability to provide for their families from afar creates a "gendered shame", particularly for men who feel they have failed in their role as breadwinners.

=== On families ===
Deportation inflicts immense hardship on families, primarily through forced separation. The decision for a parent to migrate without their children is often a "gamble" intended as a temporary sacrifice to provide a better future. However, prolonged separations have become increasingly common, with parents and children often living apart for many years. This creates a "temporal coordination" problem, where parents' lives in the U.S. move at a different pace than their children's lives in Mexico, leading to a disconnect in their experiences and expectations.

The consequences for children are severe. They often experience feelings of abandonment, resentment, and emotional distress, which can lead to behavioral problems and poor school performance. The birth of U.S.-born siblings can exacerbate these feelings, as children in the home country fear they will compete for their parents' love and scarce resources. The deportation of parents who are the sole caregivers for U.S. citizen children has a particularly devastating impact. In 2011 alone, the U.S. deported an estimated 100,000 parents of U.S. citizen children, a tenfold increase from the previous decade.

The process of "doing gender" is heavily strained by deportation. Migrant mothers bear a greater "moral burden" for family separation than fathers, as they are judged more harshly for not fulfilling their role as primary caregivers. Fathers, in contrast, often see their role primarily as economic providers, and their relationship with their children can become transactional, based on the sending of remittances.

=== On communities ===
In the United States, deportation policies create a "climate of social control" in immigrant communities. The fear of apprehension and deportation, fueled by immigration raids on homes and workplaces, makes migrants more vulnerable and less likely to report crimes or labor abuses. This dynamic helps create and maintain a compliant, low-wage labor force, as undocumented workers are less likely to organize or demand better working conditions for fear of being deported. The merging of criminal and immigration law enforcement, through programs like Secure Communities, means that any encounter with police, even for a minor traffic violation, can lead to deportation. This fosters a deep distrust of law enforcement and encourages immigrants to live "under the radar".

In the countries to which people are deported, the effects are varied. In nations like Jamaica and the Dominican Republic, deportees are often stigmatized for rising crime rates and social problems. This stigma makes it difficult for deportees to find work and reintegrate into society. In the Dominican Republic, the government "criminalizes" deportees upon arrival, booking them as criminals and requiring them to report to police as if on parole.

Conversely, in some contexts, deportees have become a valuable labor source for transnational corporations. In Guatemala and the Dominican Republic, bilingual and bicultural deportees are actively recruited to work in call centers, where they answer calls from U.S. customers for a fraction of the wages they would earn in the United States. Deportation can also exacerbate existing social problems in receiving countries. The deportation of individuals with criminal records has been linked to the growth of gang violence in Central America, as deportees bring with them the skills and networks of U.S.-based gangs.

== Economic effects ==
Mass deportation of immigrants have been projected to have a negative effect on the U.S. economy, reducing the national gross domestic product (GDP), decreasing federal tax revenues, and imposing social costs on families and communities. Studies project that such a policy would reduce the U.S. labor force by nearly 5 percent.

=== GDP and federal budget ===
A 2016 study by the Center for American Progress projected that removing the estimated 7 million unauthorized workers from the U.S. economy would result in an immediate 1.4 percent reduction in GDP, rising to a 2.6 percent reduction over 10 years as capital stock adjusts downward. The cumulative loss to GDP over a decade was estimated at $4.7 trillion. A 2017 report by the Center for Migration Studies (CMS) reached a similar conclusion, estimating a cumulative GDP loss of $4.7 trillion over 10 years.

The removal of unauthorized workers would also significantly reduce federal tax revenues, as income and payroll taxes are the primary source of federal tax financing. The Center for American Progress estimated a loss of nearly $900 billion in federal revenue over 10 years, which would raise the federal debt by an estimated $982 billion and increase the debt-to-GDP ratio by 6 percentage points.

=== Industry and state-level ===
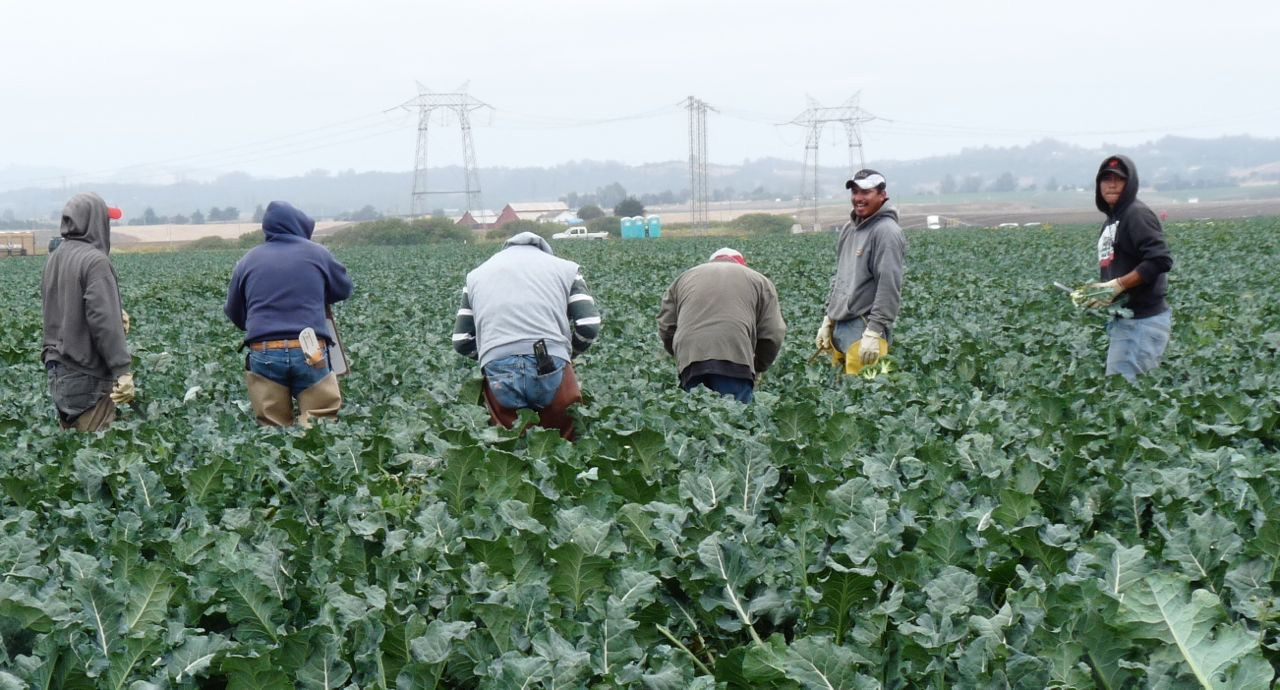
Farm workers harvesting cauliflower in California's Salinas Valley, 2013

A 2016 study projected that economic impact of mass deportations would be felt nationwide, but some industries would be disproportionately affected. Industries with the highest concentration of migrant workers, such as agriculture, construction, and leisure and hospitality, were projected to have workforce reductions of 10 percent to 18 percent, attributing to a projected 8.6 decline in gross domestic product (GDP) long-term. While these industries were projected to have the largest percentage declines, the largest absolute GDP losses would occur in the nation's manufacturing ($74 billion annual loss), wholesale and retail trade ($65 billion annual loss), and financial activities ($54 billion annual loss) industry. Mass deportation policies were projected by that study to reduce California's annual GDP by $103 billion, or about 5 percent. Texas would lose $60 billion, New York $40 billion, and New Jersey $26 billion annually.

=== Households and housing market ===
Beyond the national GDP, mass deportation would have negative effects on the finances of mixed-status households, those containing both U.S. citizens and foreign nationals. In 2014, there were 3.3 million such households in the United States, home to 6.6 million U.S.-born citizens, 5.7 million of whom were children. A 2017 study found that removing the foreign-national members from these households would slash their median income by 47 percent, from $41,300 to $22,000, plunging millions of U.S. families into poverty. The study estimated that the cost of raising the one-third of these children who would likely remain in the U.S. would total $118 billion. That same study found that the housing market would also be affected, as there were 1.2 million mortgages in 2014 with foreign nationals as members of the household, claiming that deportation "exacerbate rates of foreclosure among Latinos by removing income earners from owner-occupied households", with local immigration enforcement playing a significant role in that trend.

== See also ==
- List of people deported or removed from the United States
- Deportation from Canada
- Deportation from South Korea
