= Arrest =

Law enforcement action

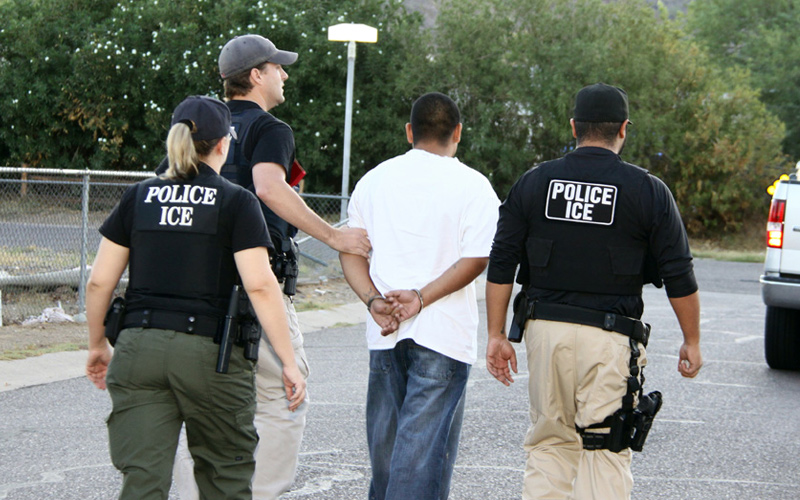
A man arrested by U.S. Immigration and Customs Enforcement (ICE) agents in Operation Cross Check

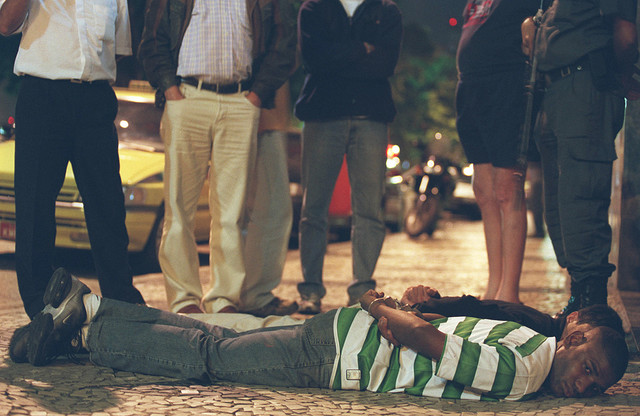
Arrested kidnappers in Rio de Janeiro, Brazil lying on the ground

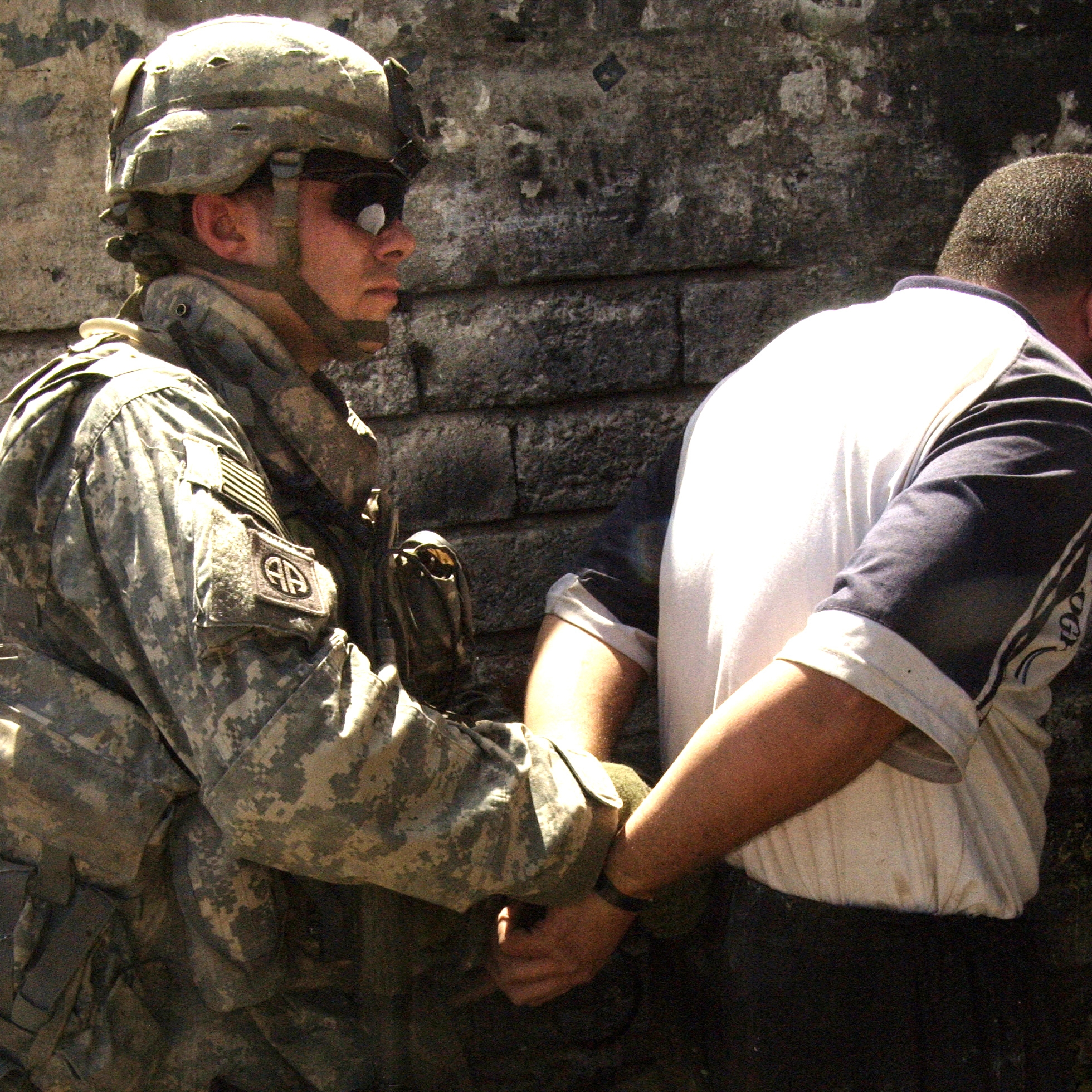
A United States Army soldier arrests a man in June 2007, during the Iraq War.

An arrest is the act of apprehending and taking a person into custody (legal protection or control), usually because the person has been suspected of or observed committing a crime. After being taken into custody, the person can be questioned further or charged. An arrest is a procedure in a criminal justice system, sometimes it is also done after a court warrant for the arrest.

Police and various other officers have powers of arrest. In some places, a citizen's arrest is permitted; for example in England and Wales, any person can arrest "anyone whom he has reasonable grounds for suspecting to be committing, have committed or be guilty of committing an indictable offence", although certain conditions must be met before taking such action. Similar powers exist in France, Italy, Germany, Austria and Switzerland if a person is caught in an act of crime and not willing or able to produce valid ID.

As a safeguard against the abuse of power, many countries require that an arrest must be made for a thoroughly justified reason, such as the requirement of probable cause in the United States. Furthermore, in most democracies, the time that a person can be detained in custody is relatively short (in most cases 24 hours in the United Kingdom and 24 or 48 hours in the United States and France) before the detained person must be either charged or released.

== Etymology ==
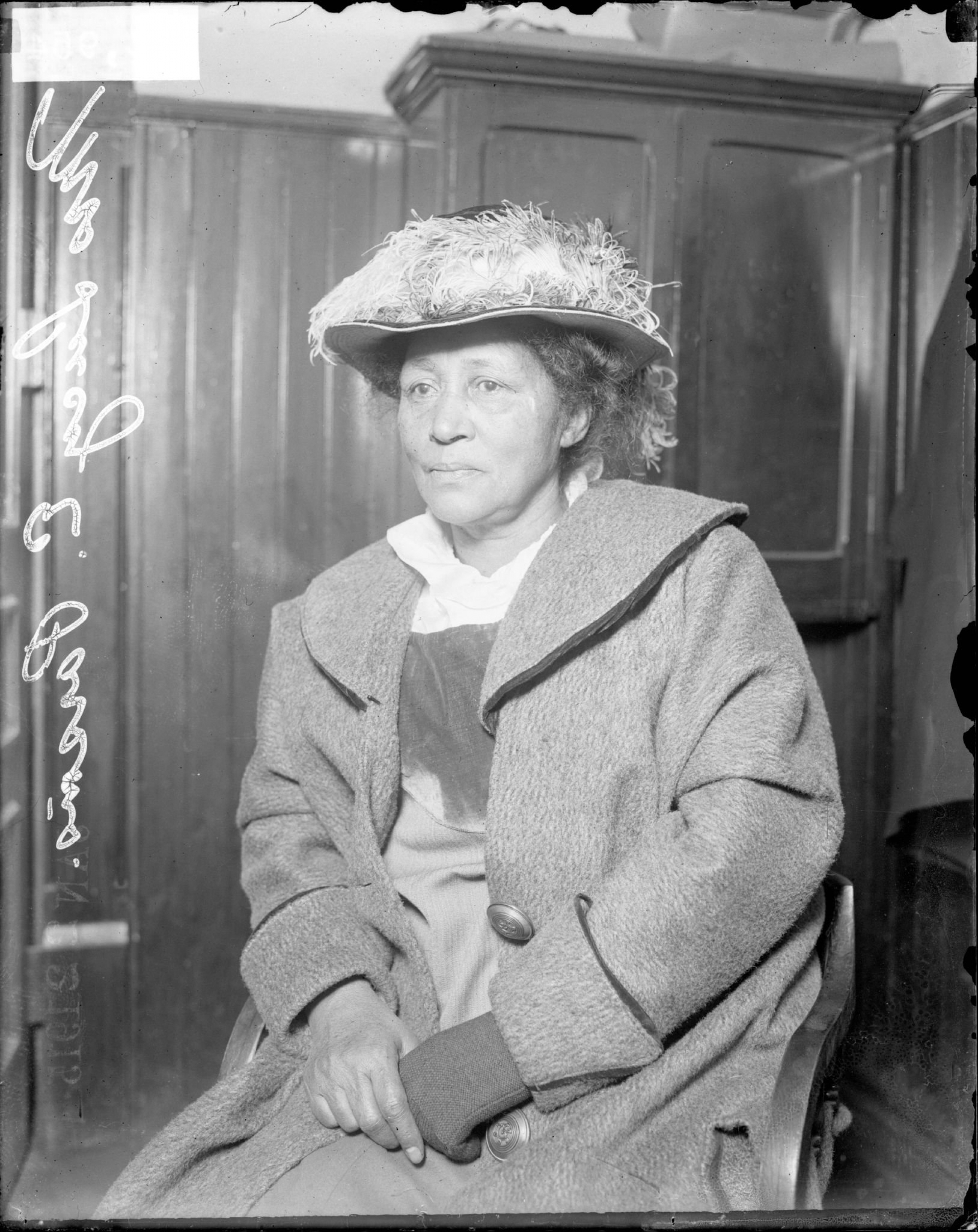
American socialist activist Lucy Parsons after her arrest for rioting during an unemployment protest at Hull House in Chicago, Illinois, 1915

The word "arrest" is Anglo-Norman in origin, derived from the French word arrêt meaning 'to stop or stay' and signifies a restraint of a person. Lexicologically, the meaning of the word arrest is given in various dictionaries depending upon the circumstances in which the word is used. There are numerous slang terms for being arrested throughout the world. In British slang terminology, the term "nicked" is often synonymous with being arrested, and "nick" can also refer to a police station, and the term "pinched" is also common. In the United States and France the term "collared" is sometimes used. The terms "lifted" or "picked up" are also heard on occasion.

== Procedure ==
=== India ===
According to Indian law, no formality is needed during the procedure of arrest. The arrest can be made by a citizen, a police officer or a Magistrate. The police officer needs to inform the person being arrested the full particulars of the person's offence and that they are entitled to be released on bail if the offence fits the criteria for being bailable. There is no general rule of eligibility or requirement that a police officer must handcuff a person who is being arrested. When there is a question regarding handcuffing a person, case law has stated that the choice to handcuff a person is dependent on the surrounding circumstances, and that officers should always take the proper precautions to ensure the safety of themselves, and the public.

=== United States ===
==== Distinction between arrest and detention ====
In the United States, there is a distinction between an investigatory stop or detention, and an arrest. The distinction tends to be whether the stop is "brief and cursory" in nature, and whether a reasonable individual would feel free to leave.

==== Minor crimes and infractions ====
When there is probable cause to believe that a person has committed a minor crime, such as petty theft, driving on a suspended license, or disturbing the peace, law enforcement agents typically issue the individual a citation but do not otherwise detain them. The person must then appear in court on the date provided on the citation. Prior to the court date, the prosecution will decide whether to file formal criminal charges against the individual. When the accused appears in court, they will be advised if formal criminal charges have been filed. If charges are filed, they will be asked to plead guilty or not guilty at the initial court hearing, which is referred to as the arraignment.

==== Arrests for serious crimes ====
When a person is arrested for a serious crime, the defendant will have their picture taken and be held in pre-trial detention. Under certain circumstances (that is where the public won't be endangered by one's release from custody), the defendant may be entitled to release on bail. If the accused cannot post a monetary bail, they will appear at their arraignment where the judge will determine if the bail set by the schedule should be lowered.

Also, in certain states, the prosecution has 48 hours to decide whether to file formal charges against the accused. For example, in California, if no formal charges are filed within the 48-hour period, the accused must be released from the arresting host's custody. If formal charges are filed, the accused will be asked to appear at their arraignment. At the arraignment, the accused will be asked to plead guilty or not guilty, and the judge will set a bail amount (or refuse to set bail) for the accused.

== Powers of arrest ==
=== United Kingdom ===
==== England and Wales ====
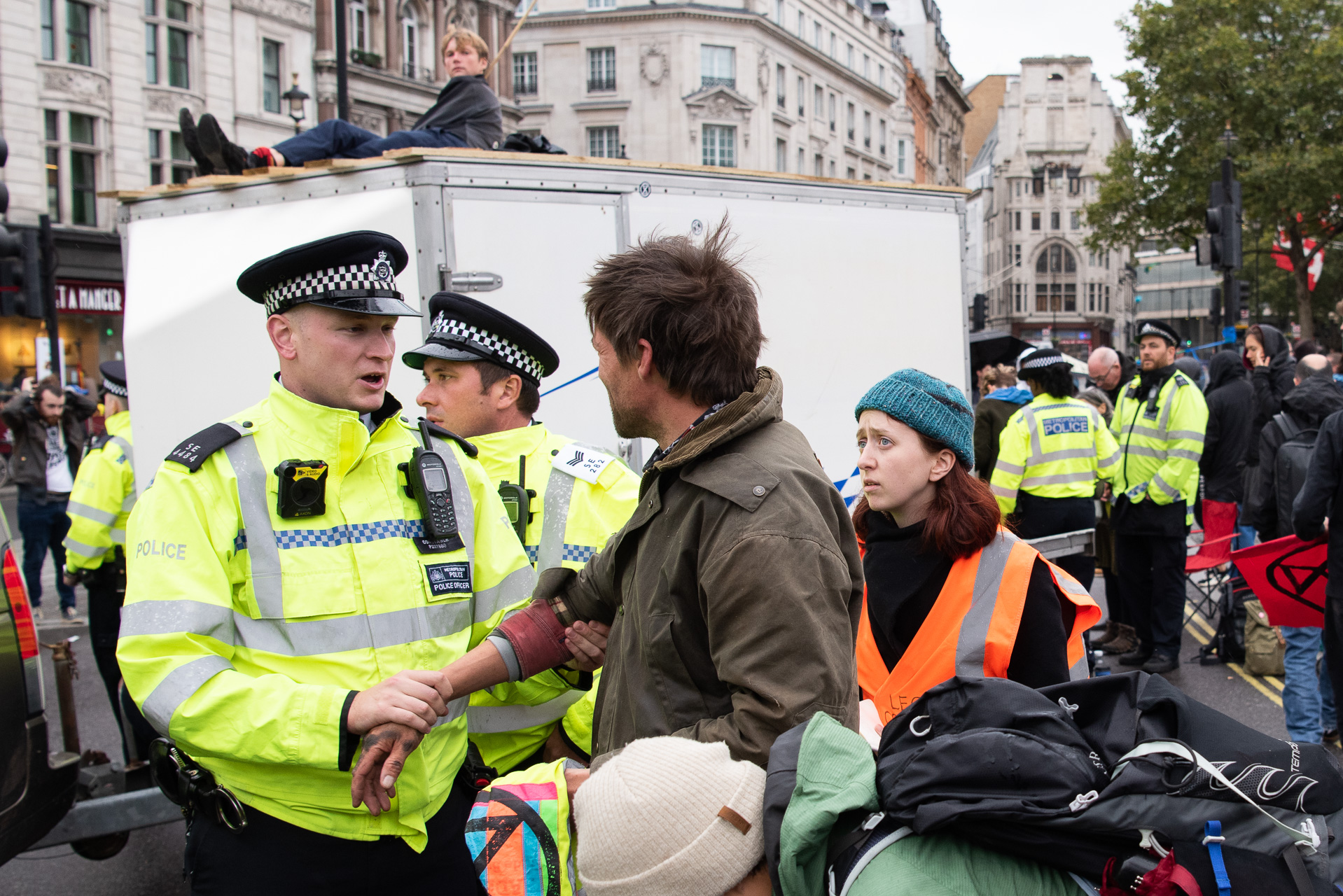
A police officer arresting a protester in London

Arrests under English law fall into two general categories—with and without a warrant—and then into more specific subcategories. Regardless of what power a person is arrested under, they must be informed that they are under arrest and of the grounds for their arrest at the time or as soon after the arrest as is practicable, otherwise the arrest is unlawful.

==== Northern Ireland ====
Arrest powers in Northern Ireland are informed by the Police and Criminal Evidence (Northern Ireland) Order 1989. This order legislates operational standards during arrest, questioning and charging a person suspected of committing a crime. Breach of this order may affect the investigation. Arrestees in Northern Ireland have the right to contact a person to inform them of an arrest, and legal representation.

==== Arrest with a warrant ====
A justice of the peace can issue warrants to arrest suspects and witnesses.

==== Arrest without a warrant ====
There are four subcategories of arrest without warrant:

- under the provisions of section 24 of the Police and Criminal Evidence Act 1984 (PACE), which only applies to constables,
- under the provisions of section 24A of PACE, applies to those who are not constables,
- the power to arrest for a breach of the peace at common law, which applies to everyone (constable or not and includes a power of entry), and
- the powers to arrest otherwise than for an offence, which apply to constables only.

=== United States ===
United States law recognizes the common law arrest under various jurisdictions.

=== Hong Kong ===
The police may arrest a person according to a warrant issued by a Magistrate under sections 31, 72, 73 or 74 of the Magistrates Ordinance. For example, an arrest warrant may be issued if an accused person does not appear in Court when he is due to answer a charge.

However, an arrest warrant is not always necessary. Under section 50(1) of the Police Force Ordinance, a police officer can "apprehend" (i.e. arrest) a person if he reasonably suspects the person being arrested is guilty of an offence. Whether there is such a reasonable suspicion in a particular case is to be determined objectively by reference to facts and information which the arresting officer has at the time of the arrest. It is not necessary that the officer knows the exact statutory provision that the suspect has violated, so long as the officer reasonably suspects that the suspect has done something amounting to an offence.

== Warnings on arrest ==
=== United Kingdom ===
In the United Kingdom, a person must be told that they are under arrest in simple, non-technical language, the essential legal and factual grounds for his arrest. A person must be 'cautioned' when being arrested or subject to a criminal prosecution procedure, unless this is impractical due to the behaviour of the arrested person.

The caution required in England and Wales states,

You are under arrest on suspicion of [offence]. You do not have to say anything, but it may harm your defence if you do not mention when questioned something which you later rely on in court. Anything you do say may be given in evidence.

Minor deviations from the words of any caution given do not constitute a breach of the Code of Practise, provided the sense of the caution is preserved.

The caution required in Scotland states:

You are not obliged to say anything, but anything you do say will be noted and may be used in evidence.

=== United States ===
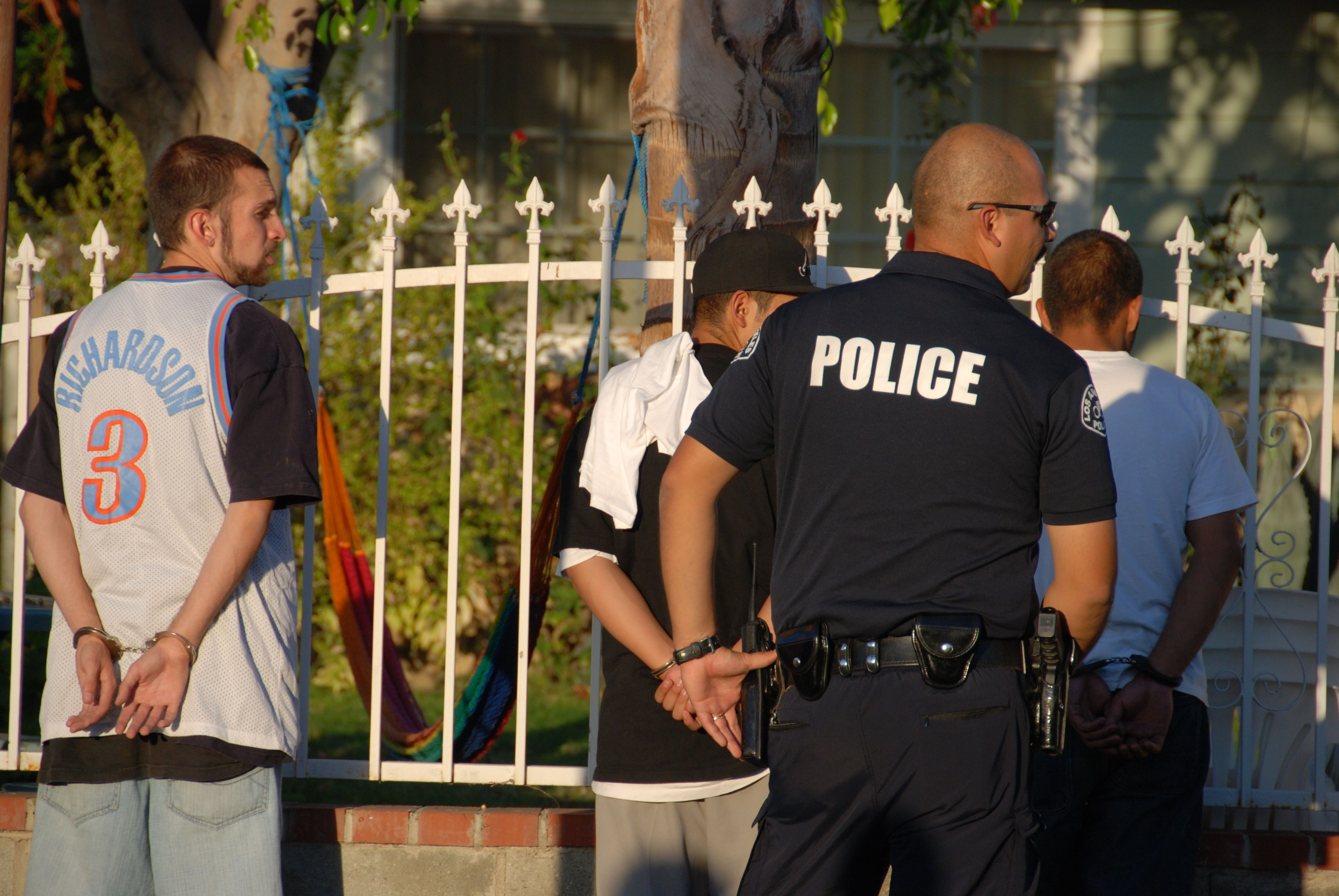
A police officer arresting suspected gang members in Los Angeles, United States

Based on the U.S. Supreme Court ruling in Miranda v. Arizona, after making an arrest, the police must inform the detainee of the Fifth Amendment and Sixth Amendment rights for statements made during questioning to be admissible as evidence against the detainee in court. A Miranda warning is required only when a person is in custody (i.e., is not free to leave) and is being interrogated, and the results of this interrogation are to be used in court.

One common formulation of the warning is

You have the right to remain silent. Anything you say can be used against you in court. You have the right to talk to a lawyer for advice before we ask you any questions. You have the right to have a lawyer with you during questioning. If you cannot afford a lawyer, one will be appointed for you before any questioning if you wish. If you decide to answer questions now without a lawyer present, you have the right to stop answering at any time.

=== Hong Kong ===
Immediately after the arrest, the police must inform the arrested of their right to remain silent. They may choose whether to answer any questions posed by the police (except that they may need to provide their name and address to the police). The police officer will caution them by saying,

You are not obliged to say anything unless you wish to do so but whatever you say will be put into writing and may be given in evidence."

== Resisting arrest ==
In many countries, resisting arrest by a law enforcement officer is against the law.

== Non-criminal arrests ==
=== United States ===
Breach of a court order can be considered civil contempt of court, and a warrant for the person's arrest may be issued. Some court orders contain authority for a police officer to make an arrest without further order.

If a legislature lacks a quorum, many jurisdictions allow the members present the power to order a call of the house, which orders the arrest of the members who are not present. A member arrested is brought to the body's chamber to achieve a quorum. The member arrested does not face prosecution, but may be required to pay a fine to the legislative body.

== Following arrest ==
While an arrest will not necessarily lead to a criminal conviction, it may nonetheless in some jurisdictions have serious ramifications such as absence from work, social stigma, and in some cases, the legal obligation to disclose a conviction when a person applies for a job, a loan or a professional license. In the United States a person who was not found guilty after an arrest can remove their arrest record through an expungement or (in California) a finding of factual innocence. A cleared person has the choice to file a complaint or a lawsuit if they choose to. Legal action is sometimes filed against the government after a wrongful arrest.

For convictions, the collateral consequences are more severe in the United States than in the UK, where arrests without conviction do not appear in standard criminal record checks and need not be disclosed, whereas in the United States, people have to expunge or (if the case goes to court) seal arrest without convictions, or if the charges are dropped. However, in the UK, Enhanced Disclosure and Barring Service (DBS) disclosures permit a Chief Constable to disclose this data if they believe it relevant to the post for which the DBS disclosure was applied.

== See also ==
- Law enforcement
- Handcuffs
- Police station
- Jail
- Arbitrary arrest and detention
- Arrest without warrant
- Arrestable offence (obsolete term in UK law)
- Citizen's arrest
- False arrest
- House arrest
- Imprisonment
- Individuals with powers of arrest
- Law enforcement agency
- Mass arrest
- Nightwalker statute
- Police and Criminal Evidence Act 1984
- Police raid
- Pre-trial detention
- Surety
