= Deportation from Canada =

Deportation from Canada is the expulsion of people from Canada's sovereign territory. The Immigration and Refugee Protection Act gives the Government of Canada the authority to deport non-Canadian citizens who live in the country illegally, who engage in serious criminality, or several other reasons.

In 2025, the Canada Border Services Agency carried out 23,160 deportations from Canada, the highest annual amount in Canadian history, predominantly to Mexico, India, and Haiti.

== Grounds for deportation ==
Sections 33 to 42 of the Immigration and Refugee Protection Act list grounds by which a foreign national in Canada can be found inadmissible, and thus, subject to deportation from the country. These are security grounds (§ 34), human or international rights violations (§ 35), serious criminality (§ 36), organized criminality (§ 37), health grounds (§ 38), financial reasons (§ 39), misrepresentation (§ 40), non-compliance with the Act (§ 41), and grounds of an inadmissible family member (§ 42). Non-compliance includes living in the country without legal status, and section 41 removals account for the vast majority of deportations from Canada.

== Statistics ==
=== By year ===
Deportations from Canada by calendar year
| Year | Number |
|---|---|
| 2020 | 12,858 |
| 2021 | 7,523 |
| 2022 | 8,335 |
| 2023 | 15,231 |
| 2024 | 17,397 |
| 2025 | 23,160 |
| 2026 (through 31 August) | 14,897 |

=== By citizenship ===
Deportations from Canada by country of citizenship (2026, up to 31 August)
| Citizenship | Number |
|---|---|
| India | 4,227 |
| Mexico | 2,282 |
| United States | 601 |
| Colombia | 580 |
| Haiti | 535 |
| Romania | 433 |
| Bangladesh | 340 |
| Nigeria | 325 |
| China | 289 |
| Turkey | 288 |
| Other | 4,997 |
| Total | 14,897 |

== See also ==
- Deportation from the United States
