= Deportation from South Korea =

Due to the increase in globalization in the 1980s, foreign workers have become a prominent presence in South Korea. This has caused an increase in deportation from South Korea as many foreign undocumented workers, specifically migrant workers, in South Korea are the most vulnerable to deportations. South Korea’s Immigration order of departure (deportation) may be challenged at the Korean Administrative Court.

== Reasons ==
The lack of economic stability plays a factor in whether foreign workers are deported as evidenced with the 1997 Asian financial crisis. If certain conditions are not met under the Employment Permit System, then the foreign worker would be considered illegal. In addition, the following reasons are for one to get deported: terrorist allegations, supporting or praising North Korea, and not having legal status in South Korea. In January 2015, Korean-American Shin Eun-mi was deported to California due to praising North Korea's wine, leading many conservatives to accuse her of siding with North Korea.

== Consequences ==
Migrant workers in South Korea do not receive any sort of payment if they have a deportation order. Even if an employer owes them a certain amount of money, that employer is not forced under South Korean law to pay them.

Deportation from South Korea also runs the risk of a 10-year re-entry ban to those who receive the punishment.

== Migrant trade unions ==
Migrant trade unions are organizations that band migrant workers to fight against wage inequality and discrimination in the workplace. In 2008, Migrant Trade Union leaders Torna Limbu and Abdus Sabur were deported for unspecified actions. Outside forces appealed the deportation, but the South Korean government deported the leaders before anything could be done. In 2018, there were six migrant workers deported due to accusations against them concerning support of terrorist organizations such as ISIS.
