= Operation Cross Check =

Ongoing US law enforcement operation

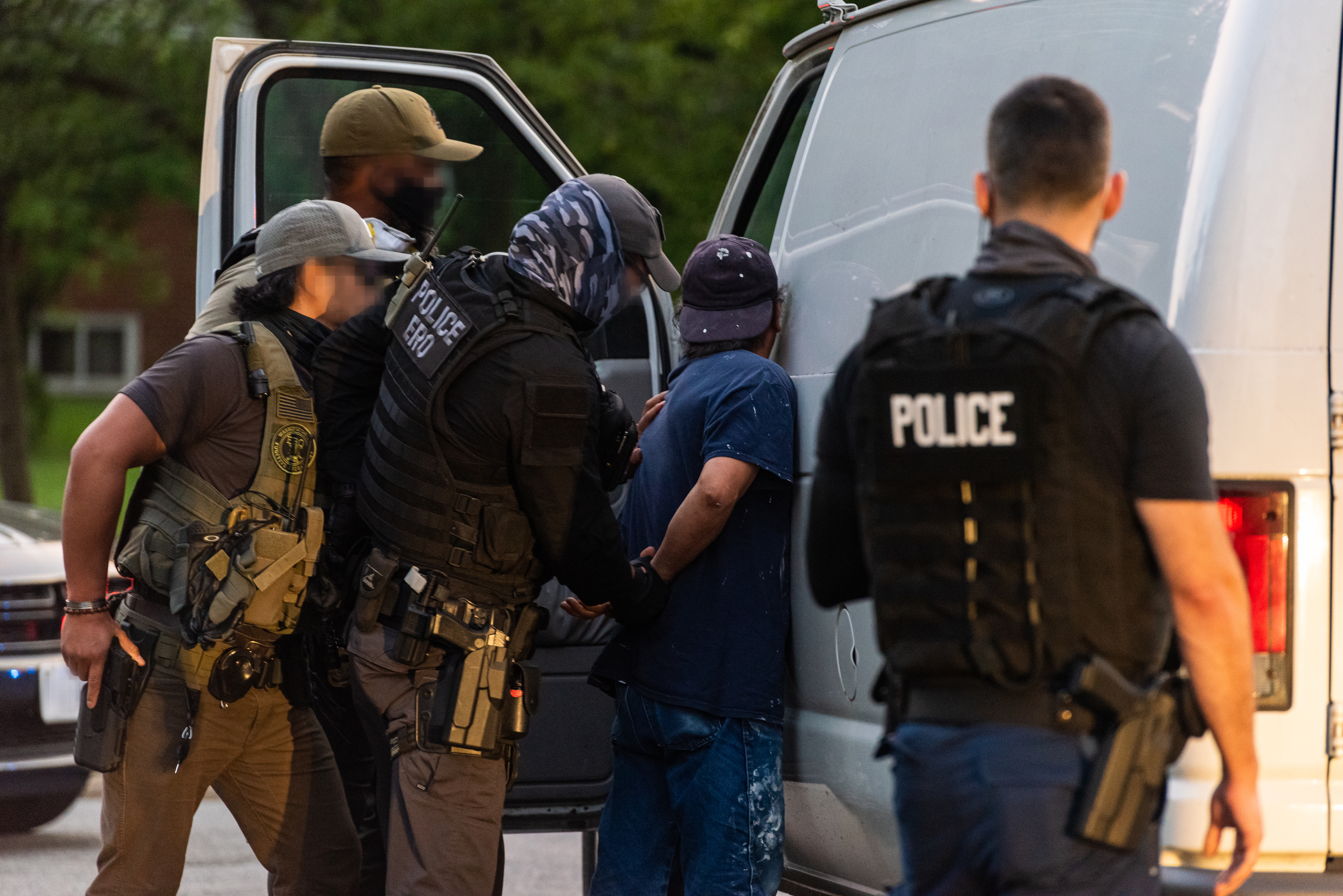
- Enforcement and Removal Operations officers apprehending a criminal target in northern Virginia during an Operation Cross Check
- Operation name: Operation Cross Check
- Operation codename: Cross Check
- Type: Law enforcement operation
- Scope: National

Participants
- Planned by: U.S. Immigration and Customs Enforcement
- Initiated by: Obama administration
- Executed by: U.S. Immigration and Customs Enforcement and Local law enforcement agencies

Mission
- Target: Illegal immigrants with criminal convictions
- Objective: To identify, arrest, and deport illegal immigrants with criminal records
- Method: Coordinated raids

Timeline
- Date begin: 2011
- Duration: ongoing

Results
- Suspects: Over 100,000 identified
- Arrests: Over 15,000 arrested in total
- Convictions: Large, mostly resulting in deportation

Operation Cross Check is an ongoing law enforcement operation led by the U.S. Immigration and Customs Enforcement (ICE) to identify, arrest, and deport illegal immigrants with criminal records. Since its launch in 2011, the operation has resulted in thousands of arrests and deportations across the United States.

== Background ==
The roots of Operation Cross Check lie in the broader strategy of ICE's enforcement priorities, which evolved significantly during the late 2000s. By 2011, the Obama administration had intensified efforts to deport illegal immigrants with serious criminal records, focusing on those who posed a potential threat to national security and public safety. The operation built on the Secure Communities program, which facilitated data sharing between local law enforcement and federal immigration authorities to identify criminal aliens.

== Operation ==
Operation Cross Check involves large-scale raids across multiple states, often coordinated to occur over a few days. These operations are highly organized, with ICE officers working closely with state and local law enforcement agencies. The operations target individuals with prior criminal convictions, especially those who have re-entered the U.S. illegally after being deported.

In 2011, 2,900 Criminal Aliens were arrested by ICE. One of the largest phases took place in March 2012, resulting in over 3,100 arrests. This operation targeted individuals involved in violent crimes, drug trafficking, and other serious offenses. Another significant operation in 2017 focused on gang members and those with ties to organized crime.

== Impact and controversy ==
Operation Cross Check has been both supported and criticized. Supporters argue that it effectively removes dangerous individuals from communities, reducing crime rates and enhancing public safety. However, the operation has also sparked controversy, with critics accusing it of targeting immigrants indiscriminately and contributing to racial profiling. Critics also note that the operation has sown fear in immigrant communities especially ones with families, leading to lower reporting of crimes by undocumented individuals.

ICE continues to defend the operation, emphasizing that the majority of those arrested have significant criminal records and are not merely being targeted for minor immigration violations. Despite the controversy, Operation Cross Check remains a key component of ICE's broader enforcement strategy under different administrations.
