= Chinese Confession Program =

US program

The Chinese Confession Program was a program run by the Immigration and Naturalization Service (INS) in the United States between 1956 and 1965, that sought confessions of illegal entry from US citizens and residents of Chinese origin, with the (somewhat misleading) offer of legalization of status in exchange. It was an important component of U.S. immigration policy toward the People's Republic of China.

== Historical context ==
The Chinese Confession Program marked the last decade in the life of the Chinese Exclusion Act, the first major federal restriction of an entire specific ethnic group's immigration in the United States. The Chinese Exclusion Act forbade the immigration of skilled and unskilled laborers from China. Exceptions were made for diplomats as well as certain family members of American citizens of Chinese origin. These exceptions were used by many Chinese to immigrate under false pretenses to the United States. For instance, Chinese-Americans who went home to visit family in China might bring back younger Chinese, claiming to be their parents. This practice was called "Paper Sons", and it came into prominence after the 1906 San Francisco earthquake and accompanying fire destroyed many of the city's records.

The Chinese Exclusion Act was partially repealed with the Magnuson Act of 1943, which allowed for the immigration of a small number of Chinese (based on the proportion of the population currently present). However, this number was vanishingly small: about 105 per annum. Thus, most migration from China remained illegal, and many American citizens and residents of Chinese origin could trace their presence in the United States to some form of immigration fraud.

The Chinese Confession Program was partly motivated by concerns in the United States about the rise of communism in China under Mao Zedong, and the role that Chinese-Americans might be playing in facilitating it, as well as the danger of communist Chinese entering the United States illegally.

== Program details ==
Although the program was described as an amnesty program whereby people could confess their immigration violations and obtain legal status, there was very little change to the immigration laws. The program's primary benefit to confessors was that if they were eligible for a statutory remedy, their past illegal entry or misrepresentation of status would not bar them from having their paperwork processed.

The following statutory remedies were available:

1. Those married to a United States citizen could apply to citizenship through that route (just as other legally present non-residents could) despite past illegal entry.
2. Those who entered prior to June 28, 1940 were available for a statutory relief called "registry".
3. Others could apply for suspension of deportation if extreme hardship and good moral character could be demonstrated.

Although confessing to the authorities offered (temporary) immunity from prosecution and deportation, the confessor had to surrender their and be amenable to deportation. Confessors needed to provide full details of their blood families as well as paper families (people with whom they had claimed to have a false relationship so as to facilitate illegal immigration). This meant that a single confessor could implicate a large number of other people, and therefore increase the risk of deportation for all these others.

== Program use ==
The program resulted in 13,895 confessions, with about 10,000 in the San Francisco region (where the bulk of the illegally entering Chinese population was concentrated). This was far less than the number of people suspected of having entered illegally, and the less than complete usage of the program was attributed to lack of trust in the United States immigration enforcement agencies among the Chinese population, the lack of clear benefits from confessing, and the risk of deportation faced by the confessor as well as their (blood and paper) family.

Since confessions by neighbors could implicate a person and lead to deportation, the program created fear and distrust in many Chinese-American communities. Anybody who had illegally entered and came in contact with the FBI before confessing was subject to immediate deportation.

The confessions had a significant impact on the Chinese-American community: as a result of the confessions, 22,083 people were exposed and 11,294 paper son slots were closed. For comparison, the 1950 Census listed 117,629 Chinese in America (excluding Hawaii).

== End of the program ==
The Chinese Confession Program was ended in 1966, shortly after the passage of the Immigration and Nationality Act of 1965.

== Reception ==
Fae Myenne Ng, author of Steer Toward Rock, called the Chinese Confession Program the Confusion Program, due to the confusion, suspicion, and mistrust it sowed in Chinese-American communities.

Bill Ong Hing, a professor of law at the University of San Francisco, and an American of Chinese origin, compared the treatment of Chinese in the United States, leading up to the Chinese Confession Program, to the way the United States treats undocumented immigrants from Mexico today. He wrote: "The “confession program” for Chinese in the 1950s was mostly a fraud perpetrated on our community, but we need not repeat that fraud for undocumented immigrants today. Let’s be honest, and treat them with the respect they deserve."
