= U.S. immigration policy toward the People's Republic of China =

With the establishment of the People's Republic of China in 1949, American immigration policy towards Chinese emigrants and the highly controversial subject of foreign policy with regard to the PRC became invariably connected. The United States government was presented with the dilemma of what to do with two separate "Chinas". Both the People's Republic of China and the Republic of China wanted be seen as the legitimate government and both parties believed that immigration would assist them in doing so.

During the 1940s and 1950s, the United States, the Republic of China, and eventually the PRC consistently used the movement of people, their laws controlling their borders, citizen services, and their interactions with the Chinese diaspora to promote the legitimacy and positive image of their respective governments internationally. Overseas Chinese were seen as extremely pertinent to either side claiming legitimacy, as both the Republic of China and the People's Republic of China realized the political and social clout held by those overseas Chinese Americans.

Furthermore, the United States also realized that it had to be very careful in choosing the right policies with regard to the status of Chinese immigrants. On the one hand the United States had to come to terms with the fact that mainland China was "lost" to Communism and on the other it had to ensure its interests in Taiwan were not compromised. US immigration policy for the next thirty years was implemented with a notion of duality. The United States government would open its doors to Chinese immigrants from both sides of the strait, however; American public opinion was not so welcoming (see Chinese American history).

== Separate policies ==
=== Background ===
In October 1949, the People's Republic of China was established after a bitter and long civil war that had lasted nearly twenty years. The Communists led by Mao Zedong had forced the Kuomintang who had originally ruled China under the Republic of China to retreat to the island of Taiwan, which in effect created two separate "Chinas". The newly established People's Republic of China began constructing its foreign policy dealings with other countries as a way of legitimizing its rule. The first of its dealings was with the Soviets. The Soviet Union recognized the People's Republic on October 2, 1949. Earlier in the year, Mao had proclaimed his policy of "leaning to one side" as a commitment to the socialist bloc. In February 1950, after months of hard bargaining, China and the Soviet Union signed the Treaty of Friendship, Alliance, and Mutual Assistance, valid until 1980.

Many Americans were at a loss of what to do as regards foreign policy concerning mainland China. The debate which took place in the United States as a result of the removal of the Kuomintang and Chiang Kai-shek to the island of Taiwan centered on Republican charges that the Democrats "lost" China. "Without question, the critics had by early 1949 convinced many Americans that Truman was, shockingly, abandoning China, China being equivalent with Chiang's dying order," journalist Robert J. Donovan wrote in his two-volume history of Truman's presidency. There was much debate on what the United States' policies was to be in regards to this new found duality. But for the next three decades the United States maintained a policy of non-recognition in regards to the People's Republic of China. The Republic of China in Taiwan was to be the legitimate China until 1979.

US policy toward China during President Lyndon B. Johnson's administration remained essentially what it had been during the Kennedy and Eisenhower administrations — non-recognition of the People's Republic of China (P.R.C.), support for Chiang Kai-shek's Nationalist government and its possession of China's seat in the United Nations, and a ban on trade and travel to the PRC.

Thus The People's Republic of China and the Republic of China fell under the same quota. However, Hong Kong was given a separate quota because it was still under British jurisdiction. Changes in U.S. immigration policy during and after World War II led to the end of Chinese exclusion and opened the door to new and diverse waves of Chinese immigration in the second half of the 20th century. In 1943, Chinese exclusion laws were repealed and small quotas established for Chinese immigration, allowing many families to reunite and for the first time admitting significant numbers of Chinese women to the United States. The establishment of the People's Republic of China in 1949 caused a large influx of Chinese immigrants in the 1950s, primarily Mandarin-speaking professionals who were displaced by the revolution and entered the United States under more lenient refugee policies.

=== Conflicts in regard to recognition ===
Due in part to political and ideological tensions between the United States and the newly established People's Republic of China, the United States maintained that the Republic of China in Taiwan was the only China it would hold official diplomatic relations with. From 1949 until 1979, the People's Republic of China and the United States had no formal diplomatic ties and it was not until the late 1960s the two countries began serious bilateral talks to improve diplomatic relations. As a result of this, the United States maintained the same quota for all Chinese immigrants coming from both the People's Republic of China and the Republic of China.

In February 1972, President Richard Nixon traveled to Beijing, Hangzhou, and Shanghai. At the conclusion of his trip, the U.S. and P.R.C. Governments issued the Shanghai Communiqué, a statement of their foreign policy views. It wasn't until Nixon's trip that the United States recognized the People's Republic of China as the official China. On January 1, 1979, the United States transferred diplomatic recognition from Taipei to Beijing. The U.S. reiterated the Shanghai Communiqué's acknowledgment of the Chinese position that there is only one China and that Taiwan is a part of China; Beijing acknowledged that the American people would continue to carry on commercial, cultural, and other unofficial contacts with the people of Taiwan. The Taiwan Relations Act made the necessary changes in U.S. domestic law to permit such unofficial relations with Taiwan to flourish. The Taiwan Relations Act also allowed for separate quotas as the term "Republic of China" would no longer be used "Taiwan" would be a separate entity under the rulings of the Nationalist party.

=== Legislation ===
The Immigration and Nationality Act of 1965 (also known as the Hart-Cellar Act) abolished the National Origins Formula that had been in place in the United States since 1924. Signed into law by President Johnson, the Act eliminated national origins quotas and established an annual limitation of 20,000 visas per country (Taiwan and mainland China were considered as one origin in this law). Priority was given to those with skills and family in United States. Since the 1960s, Chinese have immigrated to the United States in significant numbers, taking particular advantage of the immigration policy's emphasis on family reunification. In 2010, there were an estimated 3.7 million Chinese Americans.

With the passing of the Displaced Person's Act of 1948, a quota of 15,000 Chinese were able to claim refugee status and change their citizenship to that of the United States.

In 1953, the Refugee Relief Act allowed for persons living in Communist countries to vie for American citizenship. Of the 205,000 places, 2000 were allotted to Chinese.

After the Communist party took control in mainland China, many Chinese fled to Hong Kong and this in turn led to a refugee situation in Hong Kong. thus from 1962 to 1965 the Attorney General allowed 15,000 Chinese to enter as parolees due to refugee situation in Hong Kong.

Furthermore, in 1962 president John F. Kennedy's Emergency Immigration Act lead to the acceptance of 5,000 Chinese immigrants as refugees into the United States during the period of the "Great Leap Forward" in the People's Republic of China.

In 1979, the United States broke diplomatic relations with the Republic of China with the Taiwan Relations Act and gave Taiwan a separate immigration quota of 20,000 from that of mainland China. This resulted in a massive surge of Chinese immigrants from mainland China due to the renewal of relations of mainland China and the United States.

== Effects of the Taiwan Relations Act ==
=== Background ===
The reasoning behind the legislation was the need for the United States to "normalize" relations with the People's Republic of China or in other words establish some sort of diplomatic relations with Beijing while at the same time maintaining the economic and political ties with the Republic of China in Taiwan. In short upon passing the Taiwan Relations Act, the United States recognized one China—that is the People's Republic of China and the Republic of China was thereafter known as Taiwan.

=== Provisions of the Act ===
The Taiwan Relations Act provides for Taiwan to be treated under U.S. laws the same as "foreign countries, nations, states, governments, or similar entities". The act provides that for most practical purposes of the U.S. government, the absence of diplomatic relations and recognition will have no effect. The Act does not recognize the terminology of "Republic of China" after Jan. 1, 1979. It defines the term "Taiwan" to include, as the context may require, the islands of Taiwan (the main Island) and Penghu, which form the Taiwan Province and Taipei and Kaohsiung cities. The Act does not apply to Kinmen, the Matsu Islands, Pratas Island, or Taiping Island.

The Act further stipulates that the United States will "consider any effort to determine the future of Taiwan by other than peaceful means, including by boycotts or embargoes, a threat to the peace and security of the Western Pacific area and of grave concern to the United States".

This Act also requires the United States "to provide Taiwan with arms of a defensive character", and "to maintain the capacity of the United States to resist any resort to force or other forms of coercion that would jeopardize the security, or the social or economic system, of the people on Taiwan." Successive U.S. administrations have sold arms to the ROC in compliance with the Taiwan Relations Act despite demands from the PRC that the U.S. following legally non-binding Three Joint Communiques and the U.S. government's proclaimed One-China policy (which differs from the PRC's One-China Policy). The Taiwan Relations Act does not require the U.S. to intervene militarily if the PRC attacks or invades Taiwan, and the U.S. has adopted a policy of "strategic ambiguity" in which the U.S. neither confirms nor denies that it would intervene in such a scenario.

=== Influx of Chinese immigrants ===
The Taiwan Relations Act also opened the door for more immigrants of Chinese descent than ever before. Separate quotas for Taiwan, mainland China, and Hong Kong allowed for Chinese immigrants to enter the country from more diverse regions. As a result of this act and many subsequent pieces of legislation, the recognition of the People's Republic of China and the acknowledgement of its legitimacy created many Chinese-American subgroups i.e. Taiwanese Americans, those originating from Hong Kong, Southeast Asia, and mainland China. Furthermore, the notion of two separate "Chinas" which is conveyed by the act inadvertently polarized the many Chinese-American subgroups which had emigrated to the United States.

== Public attitudes at home ==
=== Portrayal in the media ===
In response to this attitude prevalent in the American public, the media occasionally portrayed characters of Eastern Asian descent as villainous communists endeavoring to destroy the west. The release of The Manchurian Candidate in 1962 with the brainwashing Dr. Yen Lo as one of its main antagonists is one example.

Marvel Comic's release of the series of comics known as Yellow Claw in 1950 featured a one hundred and fifty year old Chinese super villain. Yellow Claw's main objectives were the destruction of the western democracies and world domination. His character, though fictional, represented fears that incoming Chinese immigrants who had Communist ties would one jeopardize the security of the country.

== See also ==
- Chinese Exclusion Act
- Chinese Student Protection Act of 1992
- Chinese Exclusion Repeal Act
