= Paper sons =

Type of illegal immigrant from China

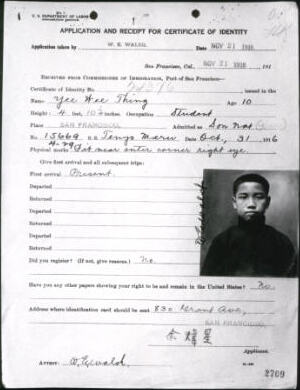
Paper Son

Paper sons or paper daughters were Chinese people who were born in China and illegally immigrated to the United States and Canada by obtaining documents with false identities that indicated they were the blood relatives of Chinese people who had already received U.S. or Canadian citizenship residency or the residents themselves. Typically it would be relation by being a son or a daughter. Several historical events such as the Chinese Exclusion Act and 1906 San Francisco earthquake caused the illegal documents to be produced.

== Background ==
With the U.S. Chinese Exclusion Act enacted in 1882, and the Canadian Chinese Immigration Acts enacted in 1885 and 1923, Chinese people were largely excluded from entering the United States and Canada.

== In the United States ==
The Chinese Exclusion Act, passed in 1882, was the first major U.S. immigration law to explicitly ban entry to the nation solely based on race or nationality. It targeted Chinese laborers, barring their immigration and prohibiting Chinese immigrants from becoming naturalized citizens. This law reflected growing anti-Chinese sentiment and marked the beginning of decades-long exclusionary policies against Asian immigrants in the United States. It stated that the coming of Chinese laborers would endanger the order of localities. As the American economy plummeted, problems of unemployment arose and blame was placed upon the Chinese for taking over jobs for low pay. In 1892, this act was renewed for another ten years in the form of the Geary Act. It was eventually made permanent in 1902. While scholars traditionally mark the Chinese Exclusion Era as spanning from 1882 to 1943, lived experiences suggest a longer timeline—one in which paper sons and daughters continued to navigate its legacy well after the laws were repealed.

Take the proceedings in the Commissioner's Court almost any morning. A Chinaman is before the Commissioner on a writ of habeas corpus; his attorney claims that he was born in the United States; the Chinaman does not claim it; he doesn't know enough about our language or customs to claim anything; but, nevertheless, there are a number of Chinese who can be found who will testify that they knew the applicant's father and mother twenty or twenty-five years ago; that applicant was born at 710 Dupont street, on the third floor, in-room No. 13; that when the boy was 2 years old he was taken to China by his mother to be educated; that he has lived in China ever since that time; that now his mother is dead and his father is dead and he wants to come back to his native America to take care of the business of his old uncle or cousin—and the uncle or cousin is there to swear to it. So common is this story, so well is it learned and so carefully is it presented in evidence in the courts, that one of the Federal Judges estimated that if the story were true every Chinese woman who was in the United States twenty-five years ago must have had at least 500 children.

— Duncan E. McKinlay, Assistant U.S. District Attorney, speaking at the 1901 Chinese Exclusion Convention

In 1906, the San Francisco earthquake caused a huge fire that destroyed public birth documents. Suddenly a new opportunity for citizenship arose: Chinese men who were already in the United States could claim that they were born in the United States. Other Chinese men would travel back to China as United States citizens and report that their wives had given birth to a son. Consequently, this made the child eligible to be a United States citizen, for which they would receive a document. These documents could then be used for their actual sons, or sold to friends, neighbors, and strangers. This was termed as a "slot" and would then be available for purchase to men who had no blood relationships in the United States in order to be eligible to enter the United States. Merchant brokers often acted as middlemen to handle the sale of slots.

To enforce the Chinese Exclusion Act, officials at an immigration station (located in Angel Island in 1910) questioned and interrogated immigrants coming from 84 different countries with the majority of immigrants being Asian and Chinese. Since official records were often non-existent, an interrogation process was created to determine if the immigrants were related as they had claimed. Between 1882 and 1943, approximately 300,000 Chinese immigrants entered the United States. Historians estimate that over ninety percent of them used false identities and documents commonly through the paper son system to circumvent exclusionary laws. These identities often required careful memorization of family trees and village histories to survive lengthy interrogations. On average an interrogation process could take up to 2–3 weeks, but some immigrants were interrogated for months. Applicants were sometimes asked between 200 and 1,000 questions over the course of multiple days. Even minor inconsistencies could lead to detention, deportation, and permanent separation from families. Immigration officials often doubted testimony from Chinese witnesses and expressed preference for "old white persons" to verify claims, reflecting the racially biased nature of the process. These questions had been anticipated and thus, irrespective of the true nature of the relationship to their sponsor, the applicant had prepared months in advance by committing these details to memory. Their witnesses—usually other family members living in the United States—would be called forward to corroborate these answers. Any deviation from the testimony would prolong questioning or throw the entire case into doubt and put the applicant at risk of deportation, and possibly everyone else in the family connected to the applicant as well. A detention center was in operation for thirty years; however, there were many concerns about the sanitation and safety of the immigrants at Angel Island, which proved to be true in 1940 when the administration building burned down. As a result, all the immigrants were relocated to another facility. The Chinese Exclusion Act was eventually repealed in 1943.

While Ellis Island is often remembered as a gateway to opportunity, Angel Island where many Chinese immigrants were detained operated more like a prison. The story of Lee Puey You, detained for 20 months in 1939, reveals the harsh realities of this system. Immigrants were confined to locked barracks, subjected to repeated and invasive interrogations, and denied contact with the outside world except under heavy surveillance. Daily life was dull and empty, with captives allowed only minimal exercise and constantly watching for signs of escape, suicide, or communication between each other. Women like Lee faced additional gendered indignities, such as having to strip naked for medical exams by white male doctors. Her story shows that detention on Angel Island wasn’t just bureaucratic delay, but dehumanization shaped by racial exclusion.

When ships arrived in San Francisco, travelers were separated based on their nationality. Europeans and other first or second-class ticket holders were allowed to disembark, while Asian and other immigrants or those who had health concerns and were in need for quarantine were sent to Angel Island for processing.

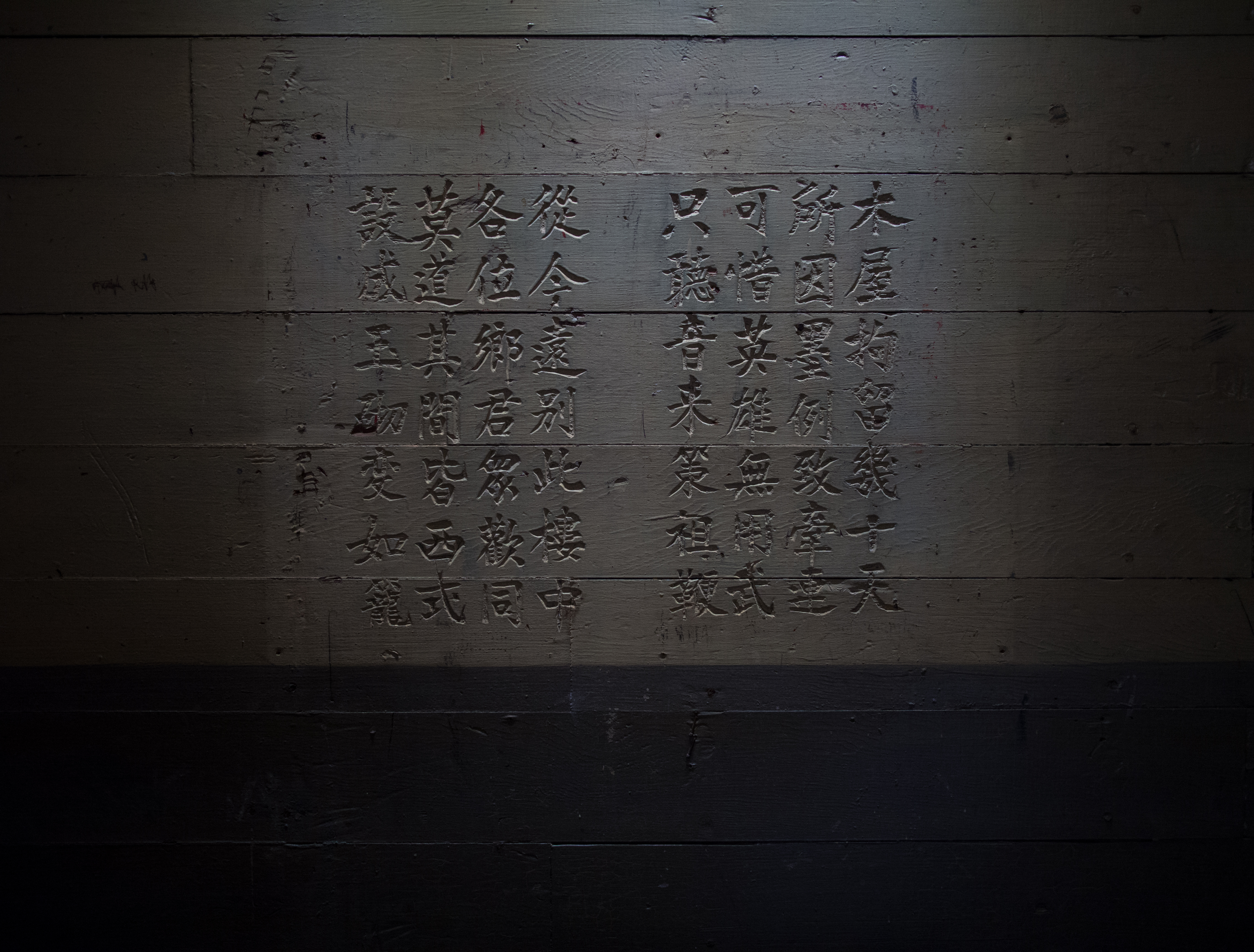
Poetry at Angel Island Immigration Station

The living conditions at Angel Island were not to be desired. A poem that was engraved on the Angel Island immigration station wooden wall describes the difficult conditions that they were kept under. The poem indicates they had been kept in a wooden house for weeks on end, and all that could be done was to wait for the voice to call for interrogation.

== In Canada ==
The Chinese Immigration Act prohibited most Chinese immigration to Canada beginning in 1923. All ethnic Chinese people in Canada were required to register with the government and were issued a number called a C.I.45, including both immigrants and Canadian-born Chinese. The C.I.45 was a continuation of earlier registration cards issued to Chinese people in Canada, beginning with the C.I.5 which was issued beginning in 1885 to indicate whether they had paid the Chinese Head Tax to enter Canada.

Even native-born Chinese-Canadians were required to register and issued C.I.28 certificates. Some Chinese people in Canada sold their certificates to prospective immigrants in China so that they could use these documents to enter Canada, assuming the identity of the original certificate holder. This is where the terms “paper son” and “paper daughter” came from, with immigrants posing as relatives of others using the C.I. they purchased.

Even after the repeal of the Chinese Immigration Acts, it was difficult for people of Chinese origin to immigrate into Canada. They were required to be sponsored by either a father, mother, or spouse.

The families of paper sons contributed to the building the Chinese communities on both sides of the Canadian/US border and achieved many of the highest honors in spite of the racial discrimination. Among them is Soo Lon Moy, past president of The Chinese American Museum in Chicago, who documents her great-grandfather Kwok Ging Huie’s journey as a paper son. His assumed identity as a paper son was Shu H. Ng. Like many paper sons, in spite of experiencing discrimination because of his race, he joined the Army during WWII and served in Normandy and among his honors was decorated with the WWII Victory Medal. The 1965 Immigration act allowed Ng to confess his identity as a paper son and reclaim his real identity as Kwok Ging Huie and thereby be naturalized as a US citizen and no longer threatened with deportation.

== Life after immigration ==
Life for paper sons after immigrating to the United States was shaped by fear, secrecy, and resilience. Although they succeeded in entering the country often by impersonating the sons of U.S. citizens using fraudulent documents, their lives remained unpredictable due to the constant threat of exposure and deportation. Many maintained complex identities, which isolated them socially. Community networks within Chinatowns provided some protection, but also reinforced their separation from mainstream American society. In the 1950s, the U.S. government launched a campaign to expose illegal entries, culminating in the Chinese Confession Program, which pressured paper sons to admit their false identities in exchange for potential legal status. While many gained legal residency through this process, others were left vulnerable, denied benefits, or subjected to prosecution especially those with suspected leftist ties. Despite these challenges, the paper sons’ confessions ultimately helped many Chinese American families reconnect and laid the groundwork for expanded immigration under the 1965 reform laws.

The state of California formally apologized to thousands of Chinese immigrants who helped build the state while facing persistent racism and debilitating laws targeting them in 2009.

In Canada amnesty was provided by the Chinese Adjustment Statement Program starting in 1960.

== After the Chinese Exclusion Act ==
After China became a World War II ally, that vast power over non-citizens was deployed in raids against immigrants of various ethnic groups whose politics were considered suspect. Many paper sons suddenly faced the exposure of their fraudulent documentations. The United States government was tipped off by an informer in Hong Kong as part of a Cold War effort to stop illegal immigration. Many paper sons were scared of being deported back to China. Only in the 1960s did new legislation broaden immigration from Asia and gave paper sons a chance to tell the truth about who they were and restore their real names in "confessional" programs, but many chose to stick with their adopted names for fear of retribution and took their true names to their graves. Many paper sons never told their descendants about their past, leaving them with confusion and disconnecting them from their family history. Some paper sons even went as far as adopting the American lifestyle by not teaching their children their home languages and forgetting any Chinese cultural aspects such as their cultural foods and rituals.

== Notable people ==
This is a partial list of people who were paper sons or daughters:

- Tyrus Wong – Chinese-born American artist. His paper son name was Look Tai Yow.
- Jim Wong-Chu – Canadian author, poet, and community activist of Chinese descent. Jim Wong-Chu came to Canada in 1953 at age four as a paper son, to live with his aunt and uncle in British Columbia.

== See also ==
- Chinese Confession Program
- Last Night at the Telegraph Club, a 2021 novel by Malinda Lo, which includes discussion of a paper son
- Identity document forgery
