= Chinese Exclusion Act =

American federal law enacted in 1882

Chinese Exclusion Act of 1882
- Long title: An Act to Execute Certain Treaty Stipulations Relating to Chinese
- Enacted by: the 47th United States Congress
- Effective: May 6, 1882

Citations
- Public law: Pub. L. 47–126
- Statutes at Large: 22 Stat. 58, Chap. 126

Codification
- U.S.C. sections created: 8 U.S.C. ch. 7

Legislative history
- Introduced in the House as H.R. 5804 by Horace F. Page (R–CA) on April 12, 1882; Committee consideration by House Foreign Relations; Passed the House on April 17, 1882 Votes 88R 102D Not Voting 52 (202–37); Passed the Senate on April 28, 1882 Votes 9R 22D Not Voting 29 (32–15) with amendment; House agreed to Senate amendment on May 3, 1882 (Agreed); Signed into law by President Chester A. Arthur on May 6, 1882

Major amendments
- Repealed by Chinese Exclusion Repeal Act on December 17, 1943

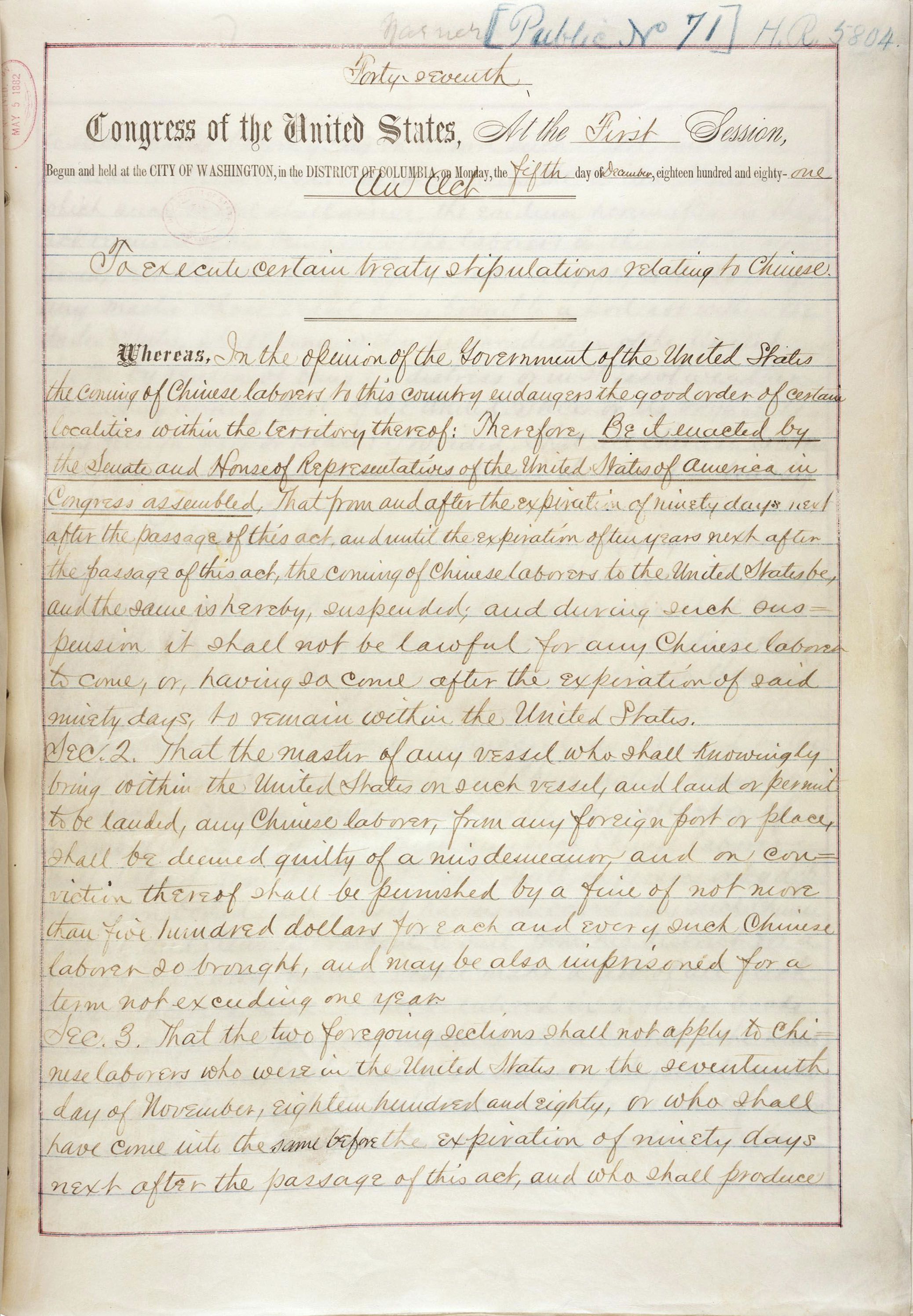
First page of the Chinese Exclusion Act passed by Congress in 1882

The Chinese Exclusion Act of 1882 was a United States federal law signed by President Chester A. Arthur on May 6, 1882, prohibiting all immigration of Chinese laborers for 10 years. The law made exceptions for travelers and diplomats. The Act also denied Chinese residents already in the US the ability to become citizens and Chinese people traveling in or out of the country were required to carry a certificate identifying their status or risk deportation. It was the first major US law implemented to prevent all members of a specific national group from immigrating to the United States, and therefore significantly shaped twentieth-century immigration policy.

Passage of the law was preceded by growing anti-Chinese sentiment and anti-Chinese violence, as well as various policies targeting Chinese migrants. The act followed the Angell Treaty of 1880, a set of revisions to the US–China Burlingame Treaty of 1868 that allowed the US to suspend Chinese immigration. The act was initially intended to last for 10 years, but was renewed and strengthened in 1892 with the Geary Act and made permanent in 1902. These laws attempted to stop all Chinese immigration into the United States for ten years, with exceptions for diplomats, teachers, students, merchants, and travelers. The laws were widely evaded.

In 1898, the Supreme Court ruled in United States v. Wong Kim Ark that the law did not prevent the children of Chinese immigrants born in the United States from acquiring birthright citizenship.

The law remained in force until the passage of the Chinese Exclusion Repeal Act in 1943, which repealed the exclusion and allowed 105 Chinese immigrants to enter the United States each year. Chinese immigration later increased with the passage of the Immigration and Nationality Act of 1952, which abolished direct racial barriers, and later by the Immigration and Nationality Act of 1965, which abolished the National Origins Formula.

== Background ==
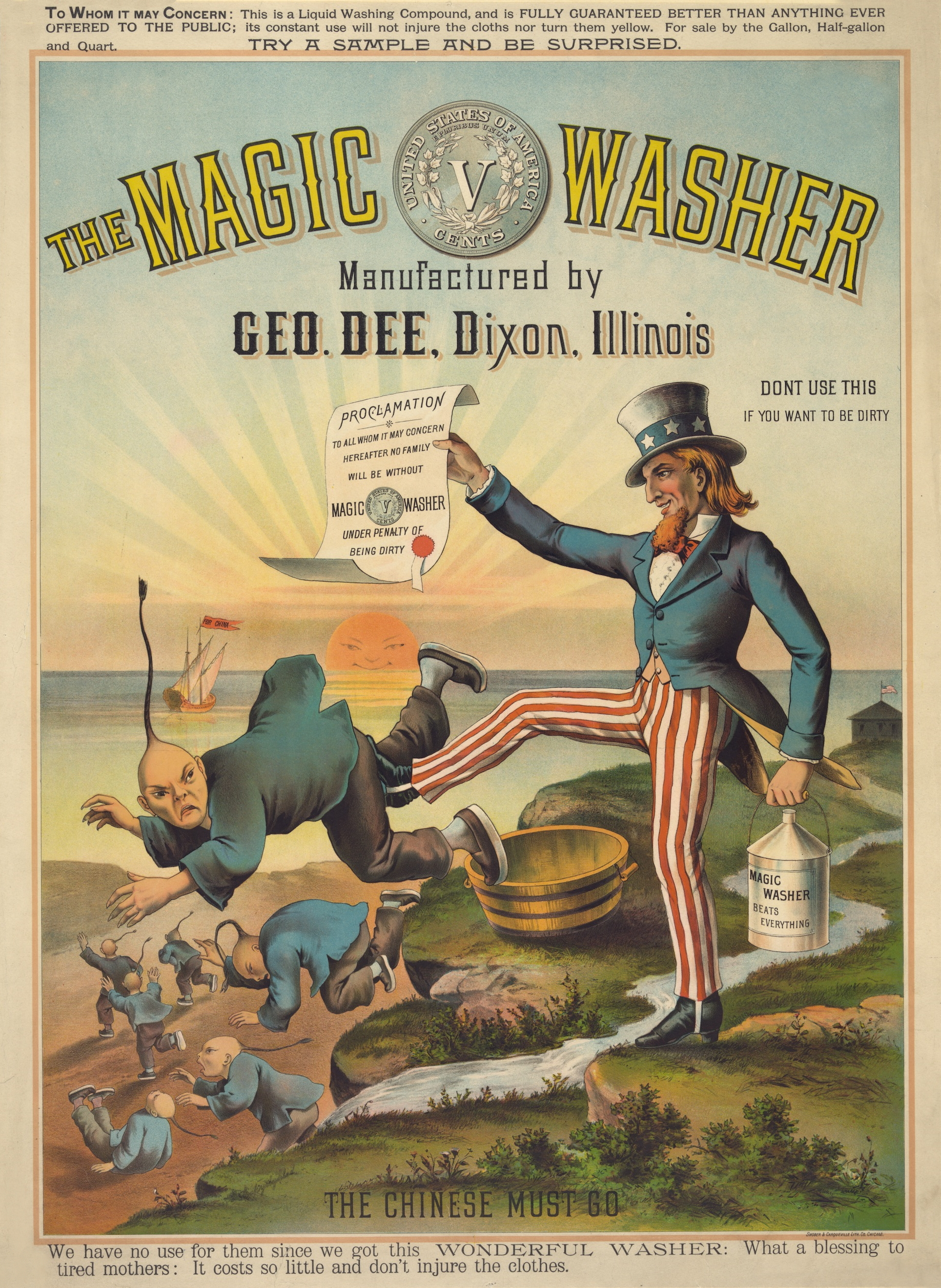
An 1886 advertisement for "Magic Washer" detergent: The Chinese Must Go

During the 19th century, China was in a state of sociopolitical upheaval due to poverty, droughts, famines, and conflicts such as the Opium Wars and Taiping Rebellion. These conditions led to large waves of Chinese immigration to Southeast Asia, Europe and the Americas. In particular, many of the Chinese immigrants who entered the United States during the 19th century were refugees who were fleeing the Punti-Hakka Clan Wars, which claimed as many as one million lives. For this reason, most of the Chinese immigrants originated from Sze Yup and spoke Taishanese.

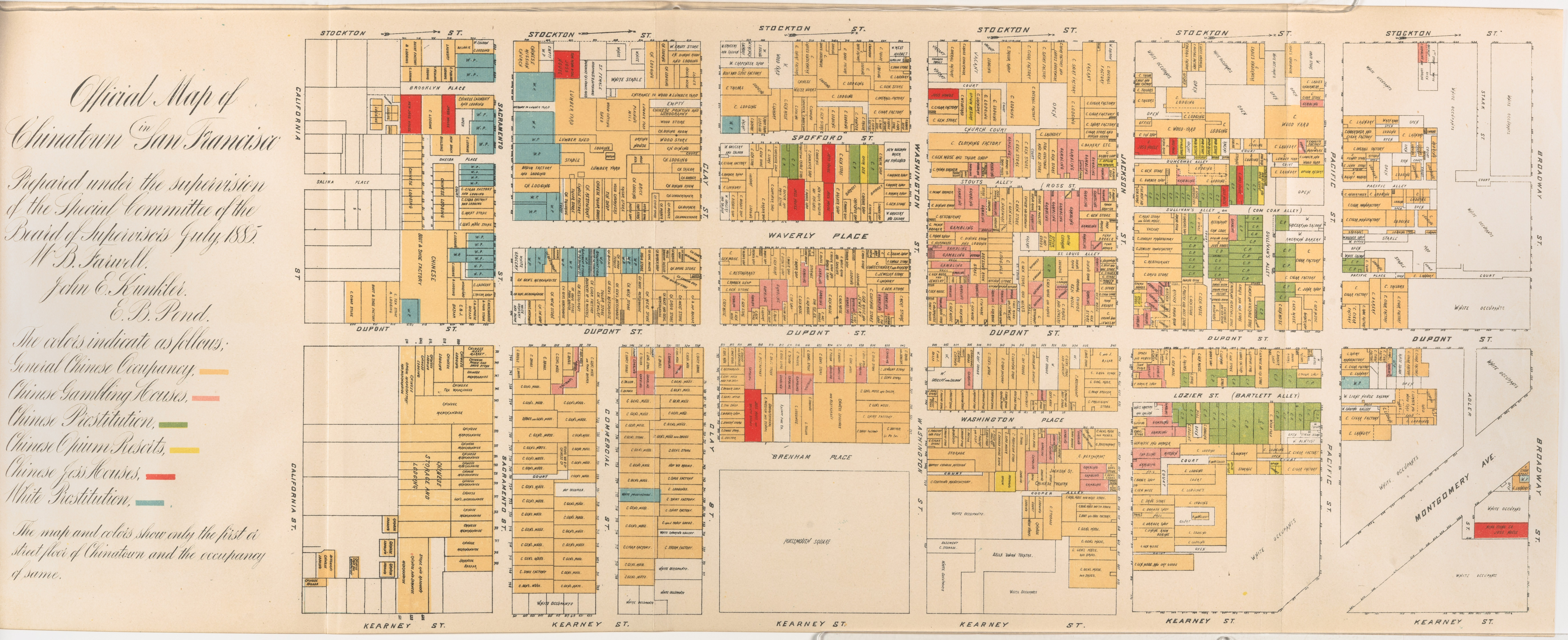
This "Official Map of Chinatown 1885" was published as part of an official report of a Special Committee established by the San Francisco Board of Supervisors "on the Condition of the Chinese Quarter".

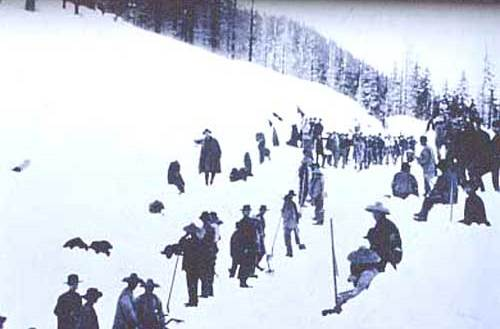
Chinese immigrant workers building the first transcontinental railroad

The first significant wave of 19th-century Chinese immigration to America began with the California gold rush of 1848–1855; it continued with subsequent large labor projects, such as the building of the first transcontinental railroad. During the early stages of the gold rush, when surface gold was plentiful, the Chinese were tolerated by white people, if not well received. However, as gold became harder to find and competition increased, animosity toward the Chinese and other foreigners increased. After being forcibly driven from mining by a mixture of state legislators and other miners (the Foreign Miner's Tax), the immigrant Chinese began to settle in enclaves in cities, mainly San Francisco, and took up low-wage labor, such as restaurant and laundry work. With the post-Civil War economy in decline by the 1870s, the anti-Chinese animosity became politicized by labor leader Denis Kearney and his Workingman's Party as well as by California governor John Bigler, both of whom blamed "coolie labor" for depressed wage levels. In addition to economic pressures, US cultural products had long promoted racist views of Chinese people. Public opinion and law in California began to demonize Chinese workers and immigrants in any role, with the latter half of the 1800s seeing a series of ever more restrictive laws being placed on Chinese labor, behavior and even living conditions. While many of these legislative efforts were quickly overturned by the State Supreme Court, many more anti-Chinese laws continued to be passed in both California and nationally.

In the early 1850s, some California Officials resisted excluding Chinese migrant workers because Chinese immigrants contributed significant tax revenues at a time when state and local governments faced financial difficulties. Historian Mark Kanazawa explains that state-level efforts to exclude Chinese workers became successful only after California's financial situation improved in the late 1850s. This shows that government decisions about Chinese immigration were influenced not only by racial discrimination and competition for but also by the state's need for tax revenue.

The Chinese immigrant workers provided cheap labor and did not use government schools, hospitals, and such because the Chinese migrant population was predominantly healthy male adults. January 1868, the Senate ratified the Burlingame Treaty with China, allowing an unrestricted flow of Chinese into the country. As time passed and more and more Chinese migrants arrived in the United States and California in particular, violence often broke out in cities such as Los Angeles. The North Adams strike of 1870, broken by the replacement of all workers by 75 Chinese men was the trigger that sparked widespread working-class protest across the country, shaped legislative debate in Congress, and helped make Chinese immigration a sustained national issue.

The Page Act of 1875 banned Chinese women from entering the United States to prevent the settlement of families, but continued to allow Chinese men and their labor.

Key to the transformation of Chinese immigration from a Californian to a national question was the political climate in 1876. This year was an election year and was exceedingly close with both parties looking to the West Coast for aid in the coming election, it was through this that Californian politicians were able to project their concerns with Chinese immigration eastward into discourse in the capital. Before 1876, Californian legislators had made various attempts to restrict Chinese immigration by targeting Chinese businesses, living spaces and the ships immigrants arrived on by way of ordinances and resultant fines, but such legislation was deemed unconstitutional through its violation of either the Burlingame Treaty, the Fourteenth Amendment, or the Civil Rights Act of 1866. In light of such failures, It became clear that the issue had to be solved by the federal government. For Californian politicians advocating against Chinese immigration, therefore, the close political competition in 1876 provided a good opportunity to propel their cause from a state issue to a national issue. The idea was that the desire for West Coast votes would compel the political parties to adopt policies to appeal to Californian voters, by making known the heavy anti-Chinese sentiment in California, Californian anti-Chinese legislators could influence political parties into adopting an anti-Chinese immigration rhetoric. This influence was conducted in a manner of ways; Firstly, throughout the spring many well-publicized anti-Chinese demonstrations were held, such as in San Francisco on April 5 which saw 20,000 people attend.

Secondly, on April 3, the California State Senate authorized an investigation on the effects of Chinese immigration on the state's culture and economy, with the findings to be sent to 'leading newspapers of the United States' and 5 copies for each member of Congress. Furthering these measures was the sending of a delegation by the San Francisco Board of Supervisors to cities in the east to express anti-Chinese sentiment to crowds (and later newspapers). Members of this delegation Philip Roach and Frank Pixley talked about the economic threat Chinese 'coolie' labor posed, but also on the perceived racial incompatibility and inferiority of Chinese immigrants, driving up fears and anxieties in other states. These remarks also found their way to senate hearings, such an example can be seen on May 1: Republican Aaron A. Sargent, the senior senator for California, addressed the senate with a vicious attack on Chinese immigration before they voted on treaty negotiations with China. The result of these efforts, among others, culminated in the overwhelming support of anti-Chinese policies by both political parties observed in their respective conventions in June. It is for these reasons then that the election year of 1876 was instrumental in changing the question of Chinese immigration from a state to a national question; The competitive political atmosphere allowed a calculated political attempt to nationalize California's Immigration grievances, as such leaders across the country (whose concerns with the benefits or ill of Chinese-labour were second to winning votes) were compelled to advocacy for anti-Chinese sentiment.

"Political Suicide of President Hayes," a caricature of president Rutherford B. Hayes by George Frederick Keller published in The Wasp, March 8, 1879

Numerous strikes followed the North Adams strike, notably Beaver Falls Cutlery Company in Pennsylvania and others After the economy soured in the Panic of 1873, Chinese immigrants were blamed for depressing workmen's wages. At one point, Chinese men represented nearly a quarter of all wage-earning workers in California. By 1878, Congress felt compelled to try to ban immigration from China in legislation that was later vetoed by President Rutherford B. Hayes. The title of the August 27, 1873, San Francisco Chronicle article, "The Chinese Invasion! They Are Coming, 900,000 Strong", was traced by The Atlantic as one of the roots of the 2019 anti-immigration "invasion" rhetoric. Furthermore, in 1876, the San Francisco lawyer H. N. Clement stood before a California State Committee and said: "The Chinese are upon us. How can we get rid of them? The Chinese are coming. How can we stop them?". This perfectly reflected the overall feeling of many Americans at the time, and how public officials were partly responsible in making this situation seem even more serious than it actually was.

In 1879, however, California adopted a new Constitution which explicitly authorized the state government to determine which individuals were allowed to reside in the state, and banned the Chinese from employment by corporations and state, county or municipal governments.

Three years later, after China had agreed to treaty revisions, Congress tried again to exclude working-class Chinese laborers; Senator John F. Miller of California introduced another Chinese Exclusion Act that blocked entry of Chinese laborers for a twenty-year period. The bill passed the Senate and House by overwhelming margins, but this as well was vetoed by President Chester A. Arthur, who concluded the 20-year ban to be a breach of the renegotiated treaty of 1880. That treaty allowed only a "reasonable" suspension of immigration. Eastern newspapers praised the veto, while it was condemned in the Western states. Congress was unable to override the veto, but passed a new bill reducing the immigration ban to ten years. The House of Representatives voted 201–37, with 51 abstentions, to pass the act. Although he still objected to this denial of entry to Chinese laborers, President Arthur acceded to the compromise measure, signing the Chinese Exclusion Act into law on May 6, 1882.

The Chinese Exclusion Act also created difficulties for Chinese Immigrants who wanted to travel outside the United States and return home. Chinese immigrants faced strict documentation requirements when attempting to reenter the country, making international travel more difficult for them.

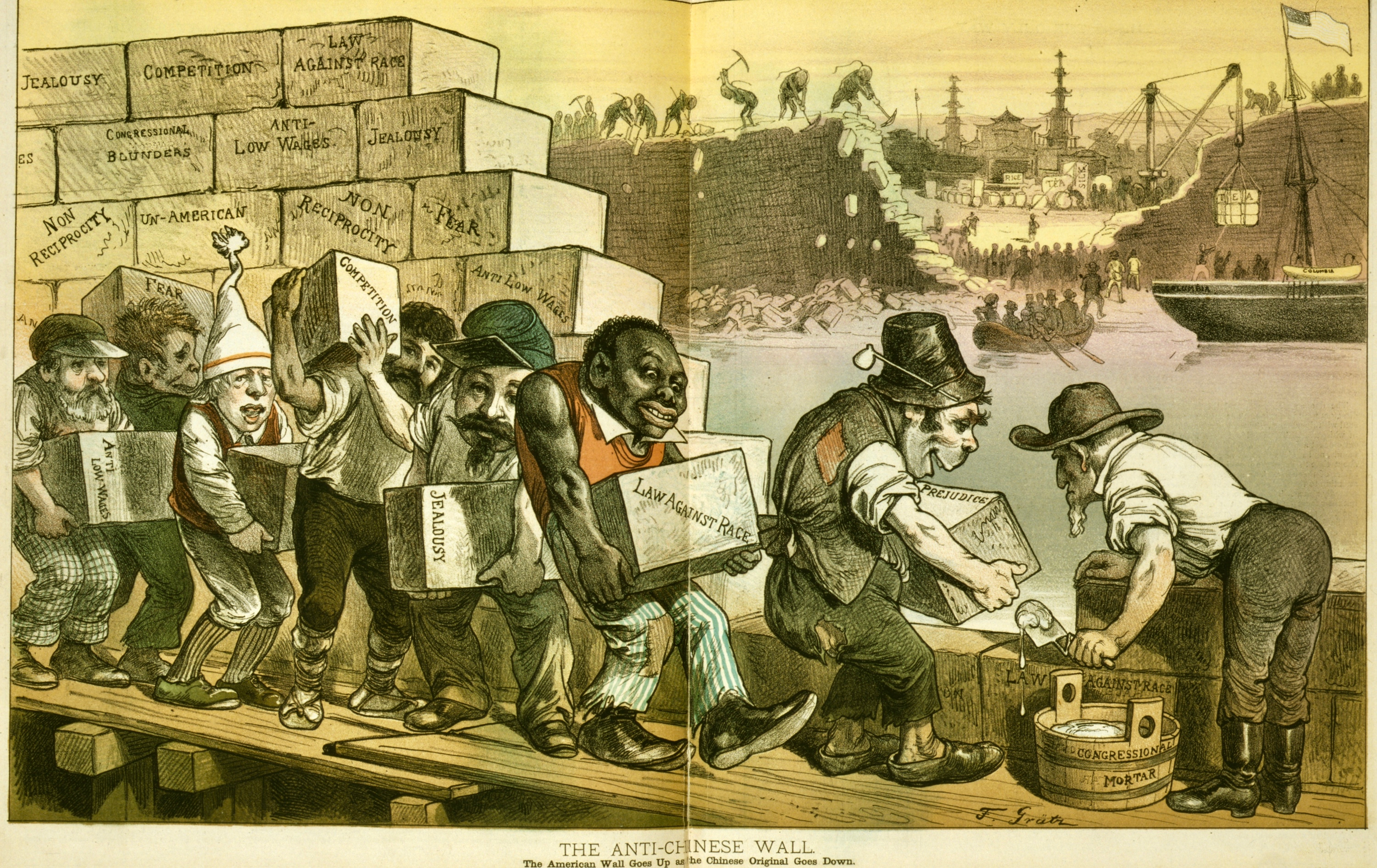
Anti-Chinese Wall cartoon in Puck

After the act was passed, most Chinese workers were faced with a dilemma: stay in the United States alone or return to China to reunite with their families. Although widespread dislike for the Chinese persisted well after the law itself was passed, of note is that some capitalists and entrepreneurs resisted their exclusion because they accepted lower wages.

When the exclusion act expired in 1892, Congress extended it 10 more years in the form of the Geary Act. This extension was then made permanent in 1902 which led to every Chinese American ordered to gain a certificate of residence from the US government or face deportation. This act regulated Chinese immigration into the 20th century.

== Content ==
The Act was the first US immigration law to target a specific ethnicity or nationality. The earlier Page Act of 1875 had prohibited immigration of Asian forced laborers and sex workers, and the Naturalization Act of 1790 prohibited naturalization of non-white subjects. The Chinese Exclusion Act excluded Chinese laborers, meaning "skilled and unskilled laborers and Chinese employed in mining", from entering the country for ten years under penalty of imprisonment and deportation.

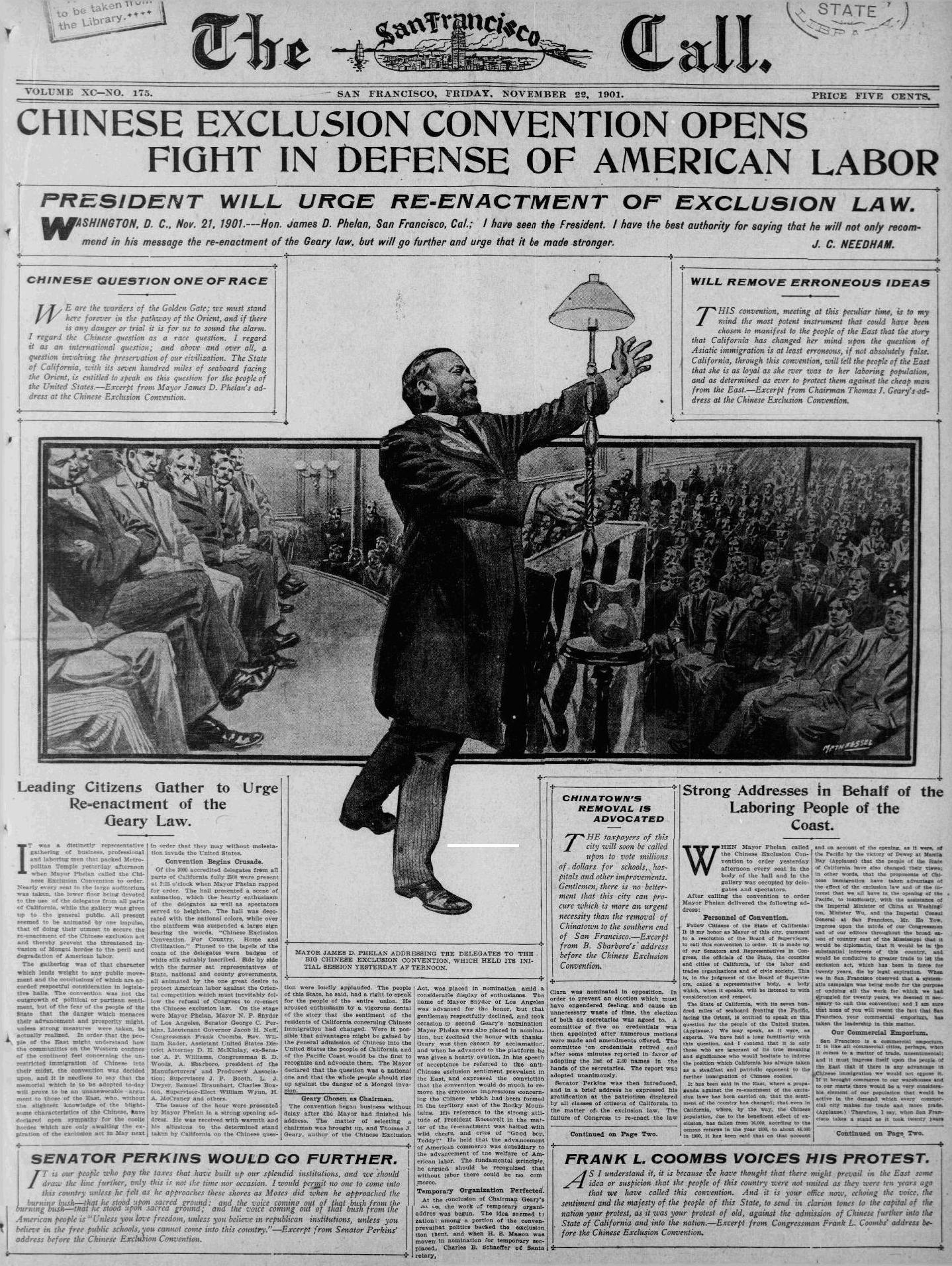
Front page of The San Francisco Call from November 20, 1901, discussing the Chinese Exclusion Convention

The Chinese Exclusion Act required the few non-laborers who sought entry to obtain certification from the Chinese government that they were qualified to emigrate. However, this group found it increasingly difficult to prove that they were not laborers because the 1882 Act defined excludables as "skilled and unskilled laborers and Chinese employed in mining". Thus very few Chinese could enter the country under the 1882 law. Diplomatic officials and other officers, along with their house servants, on business for the Chinese government were also allowed entry as long as they had the proper certification verifying their credentials.

The Chinese Exclusion Act also affected the Chinese who had already settled in the United States. Any Chinese who left the United States had to obtain certifications for reentry, and the act made Chinese immigrants permanent aliens by excluding them from US citizenship. After the act's passage, Chinese men in the US had little chance of ever reuniting with their wives, or of starting families in their new abodes.

Individual immigration records also illustrate the effects of exclusion-era immigration policies on Chinese families. A case preserved by the National Archives documents Soo Hoo Lem Kong, a ten-year-old boy whose parents applied for him to enter the United States and join his father. His case file includes his declaration to enter the United States and an interview conducted as part of the immigration process.

From 1910 to 1930, the angel Island Immigration Station in San Francisco Bay served as a major entry point for Asian immigrants and a place where the Chinese exclusion Act and other anti-Asian immigration policies were enforced. In a study using passenger records from the Pacific Mail Steamship Company between 1912 and 19919, Robert Barde and Gustavo J. Bobonis examined how long arriving passengers were detained, they found that many Chinese passengers were not detained, while the length of detention varied among those who were held. The researchers also found that claimed exemption status explained only part of the differences in detention length. These findings show that Chinese immigrants experienced different outcomes during the enforcement of exclusion laws.

Amendments made in 1884 tightened the provisions that allowed previous immigrants to leave and return and clarified that the law applied to ethnic Chinese regardless of their country of origin. The 1888 Scott Act expanded upon the Chinese Exclusion Act, prohibiting reentry into the US after leaving. Only teachers, students, government officials, tourists, and merchants were exempt.

The Scott Act of 1888 made it unlawful for Chinese laborers who had left the United states and had not returned before the law was passed to reenter the country. It also canceled previously issued certificates that had allowed Chinese laborers to return. As a result, some Chinese immigrants who had traveled to Chine would no longer return to the United States, even if they had previously lived there legally and held re-entry documents.

Constitutionality of the Chinese Exclusion Act and the Scott Act was upheld by the Supreme Court in Chae Chan Ping v. United States (1889); the Supreme Court declared that "the power of exclusion of foreigners [is] an incident of sovereignty belonging to the government of the United States as a part of those sovereign powers delegated by the constitution". The act was renewed for ten years by the 1892 Geary Act, and again with no terminal date in 1902. When the act was extended in 1902, it required "each Chinese resident to register and obtain a certificate of residence. Without a certificate, he or she faced deportation."

The Geary Act also created serious consequences for Chinese residents who couldn't not provide the required documentation. Chinese immigrants who lacked the necessary papers or witnesses could face imprisonment or deportation. These requirements placed additional pressure on Chinese residents to prove their legal right to remain in the United States and made their continued residence depend on government documentation.

Between 1882 and 1905, about 10,000 Chinese appealed against negative immigration decisions to federal court, usually via a petition for habeas corpus. In most of these cases, the courts ruled in favor of the petitioner. Except in cases of bias or negligence, these petitions were barred by an act that passed Congress in 1894 and was upheld by the US Supreme Court in United States v. Lem Moon Sing (1895). In United States v. Ju Toy (1905), the US Supreme Court reaffirmed that the port inspectors and the Secretary of Commerce had final authority on who could be admitted. Ju Toy's petition was thus barred despite the fact that the district court found that he was an American citizen. The Supreme Court determined that refusing entry at a port does not require due process and is legally equivalent to refusing entry at a land crossing. All these developments, along with the extension of the act in 1902, triggered a boycott of US goods in China between 1904 and 1906. There was one 1885 case in San Francisco, however, in which Treasury Department officials in Washington overturned a decision to deny entry to two Chinese students.

One of the critics of the Chinese Exclusion Act was the anti-imperialist senator George Frisbie Hoar, a Republican from Massachusetts who described the act as "nothing less than the legalization of racial discrimination".

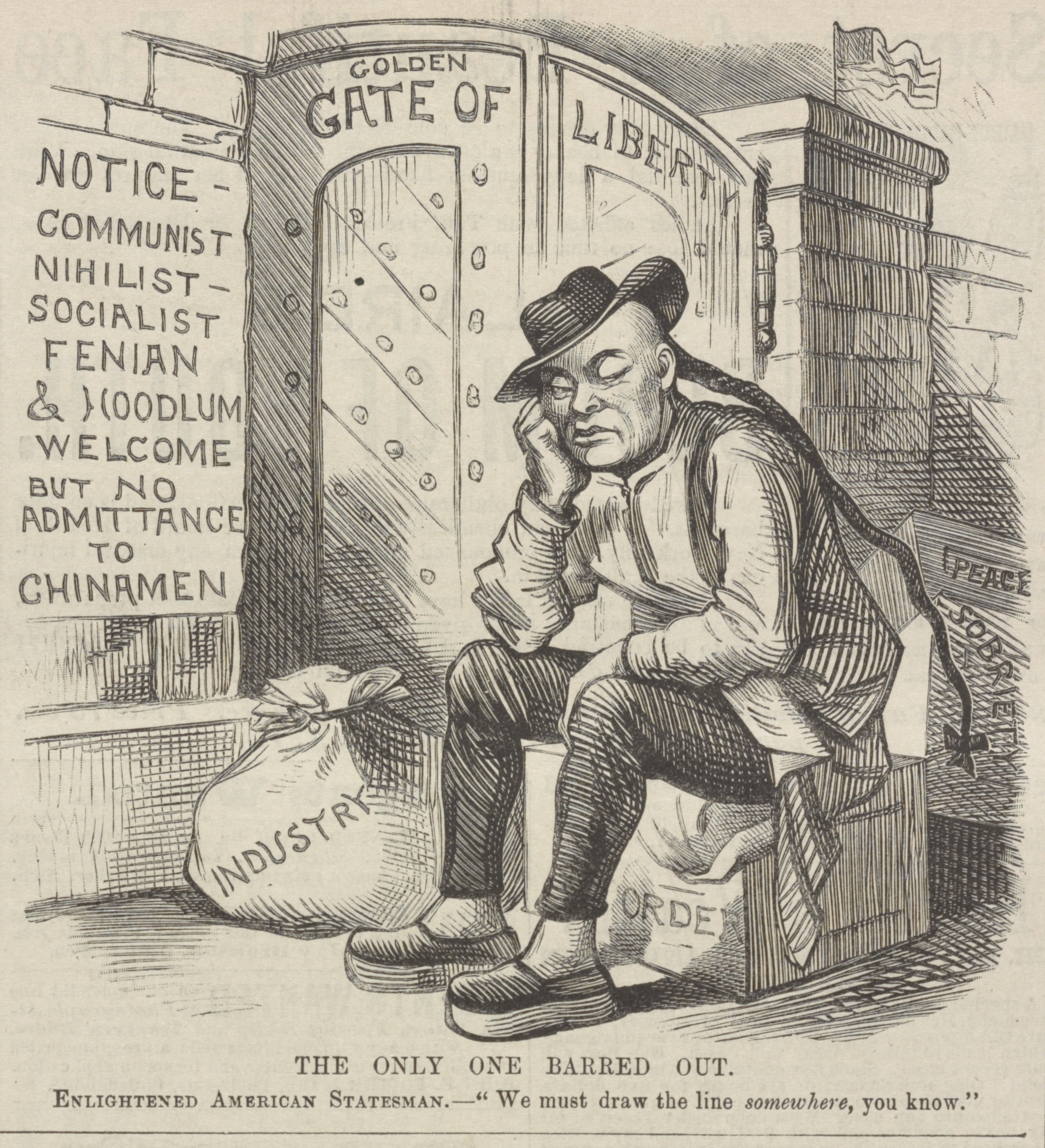
A political cartoon from 1882, showing a Chinese man being barred entry to the "Golden Gate of Liberty". The caption reads, "We must draw the line somewhere, you know."

The laws were driven largely by racial concerns; immigration of persons of other races was not yet limited. On the other hand, most people and unions strongly supported the Chinese Exclusion Act, including the American Federation of Labor and Knights of Labor, a labor union, who supported it because it believed that industrialists were using Chinese workers as a wedge to keep wages low. Among labor and leftist organizations, the Industrial Workers of the World were the sole exception to this pattern. The IWW openly opposed the Chinese Exclusion Act from its inception in 1905.

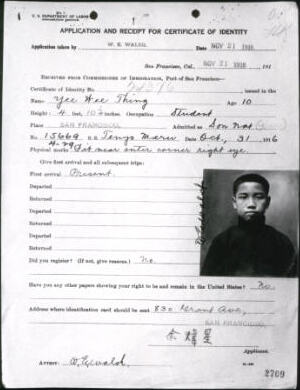
Certificate of identity issued to Yee Wee Thing certifying that he is the son of a US citizen, issued November 21, 1916. This was necessary for his immigration from China to the United States.

The racial concerns the Exclusion Act drew justification from were along the lines of a perceived 'moral deficiency' of Chinese immigrants, this charge stipulated the inherent unreliability and dishonesty of the immigrants on behalf of their race. These assumptions of character were frequently assigned on behalf of the poor communities these immigrants lived in with higher density, higher crime, saloons and opium dens. This is however not an exhaustive list of charges brought against Chinese immigrants, many more assumptions were made such as them bringing leprosy to US shores. Some of the main proponents of this racialism were Irish immigrants in the West, the reason for this was that although granted entry under the Naturalization Act of 1790 as a free 'white' people, the large numbers of immigrants from Europe starting in the 1840s created a situation where different white ethnicities were being made out to be more or less desirable compared to Anglo-Saxons. In such a way the Celtic Irish in the east faced similar racialism at the hands of nativists, being categorized as 'dirty', 'drunken', and 'animalistic papists'. In this way, under Denis Kearney and the Workingman's Party, many Irish immigrants who had migrated westward sought to shore up their 'whiteness' and redirect stereotypes about themselves by stressing the undesirability of the Chinese, non-white immigrants.

For all practical purposes, the Chinese Exclusion Act, along with the restrictions that followed it, froze the Chinese community in place in 1882. Limited immigration from China continued until the repeal of the act in 1943. From 1910 to 1940, the Angel Island Immigration Station on what is now Angel Island State Park in San Francisco Bay served as the processing center for most of the 56,113 Chinese immigrants who are recorded as immigrating or returning from China; upwards of 30% more who arrived there were returned to China. The Chinese population in the US declined from approximately 105,000 in 1880, to 89,000 in 1900, and to 61,000 in 1920.

Certain federal agencies were active in the 19th century to enforce the Exclusion Act. The Customs Service took the lead on this because of the maritime nature. In the 1900s the Office of the Superintendent of Immigration was established by the Department of the Treasury and given responsibility for implementing federal regulations mandated by the Chinese exclusion laws. This organization is now known as the Immigration and Naturalization Service (INS).

The act exempted merchants, and restaurant owners could apply for merchant visas beginning in 1915 after a federal court ruling. This led to the rapid growth of Chinese restaurants in the 1910s and 1920s as restaurant owners could leave and reenter along with family members from China.

Later, the Immigration Act of 1924 restricted immigration even further, excluding all classes of Chinese immigrants and extending restrictions to other Asian immigrant groups. Until these restrictions were relaxed in the middle of the twentieth century, Chinese immigrants were forced to live a life separated from their families, and to build ethnic enclaves in which they could survive on their own (Chinatown). The Chinese Exclusion Act did not address the problems that whites were facing; in fact, the Chinese were quickly and eagerly replaced by the Japanese, who assumed the role of the Chinese in society. Unlike the Chinese, some Japanese were even able to climb the rungs of society by setting up businesses or becoming truck farmers. However, the Japanese were later targeted in the Immigration Act of 1924, which banned immigration from East Asia entirely. The Chinese Exclusion Act was a tool with an aim to, maintain cheap accessible labor while stopping the excess population of Chinese immigrants from taking jobs from white Americans.

In 1891, the Chinese government refused to accept US Senator Henry W. Blair as US Minister to China due to his abusive remarks regarding China during negotiations of the Chinese Exclusion Act. The American Christian George F. Pentecost spoke out against Western imperialism in China, saying:

I personally feel convinced that it would be a good thing for America if the embargo on Chinese immigration were removed. I think that the annual admission of 100,000 into this country would be a good thing for the country. And if the same thing were done in the Philippines those islands would be a veritable Garden of Eden in twenty-five years. The presence of Chinese workmen in this country would, in my opinion, do a very great deal toward solving our labor problems. There is no comparison between the Chinaman, even of the lowest coolie class, and the man who comes here from Southeastern Europe, from Russia, or from Southern Italy. The Chinese are thoroughly good workers. That is why the laborers here hate them. I think, too, that the emigration to America would help the Chinese. At least he would come into contact with some real Christian people in America. The Chinaman lives in squalor because he is poor. If he had some prosperity his squalor would cease.

== The "Driving Out" period ==
Following the passing of the Chinese Exclusion Act, a period known as the "Driving Out" era was born. In this period, anti-Chinese Americans physically forced Chinese communities to flee to other areas. Large scale violence in Western states included the Rock Springs massacre (1885) and the Hells Canyon massacre (1887).

=== Rock Springs massacre of 1885 ===
The massacre was named for the town where it took place, Rock Springs, Wyoming, in Sweetwater County, where white miners were envious of the Chinese for their employment. White miners expressed their jealous frustration by robbing, bullying, shooting, and stabbing the Chinese in Chinatown. The Chinese tried to flee but many were burned alive in their homes, starved to death in hidden refuge, or exposed to carnivorous animal predators in the mountains. Some were rescued by a passing train, but by the end of the event at least twenty-eight lives had been taken. In an attempt to appease the situation, the government intervened by sending federal troops to protect the Chinese. However, only compensations for destroyed property were paid. No one was arrested nor held accountable for the atrocities committed during the riot.

=== Hells Canyon massacre of 1887 ===
The massacre was named for the location where it took place, along the Snake River in Hells Canyon, Oregon, near the mouth of Deep Creek. The area contained many rocky cliffs and white rapids that together posed significant danger to human safety. 34 Chinese miners were killed at the site. The miners were employed by the Sam Yup company, one of the six largest Chinese companies at the time, which worked in this area since October 1886. The actual events are still unclear due to unreliable law enforcement at the time, biased news reporting, and lack of serious official investigations. However, it is speculated that the dead Chinese miners were not victims of natural causes, but rather victims of gun shot wounds during a robbery committed by a gang of seven armed horse thieves. Gold worth $4,000–5,000 was thought to have been stolen from the miners. The gold was never recovered nor further investigated.

==== Aftermath ====
Shortly following the incident, the Sam Yup company of San Francisco hired Lee Loi, who later hired Joseph K. Vincent, then US Commissioner, to lead an investigation. Vincent submitted his investigative report to the Chinese consulate who tried unsuccessfully to obtain justice for the Chinese miners. At around the same time, other compensation reports were also unsuccessfully filed for earlier crimes inflicted on the Chinese. In the end, on October 19, 1888, Congress agreed to greatly under-compensate for the massacre and ignore the claims for the earlier crimes. Even though the amount was greatly underpaid, it was still a small victory to the Chinese who had low expectations for relief or acknowledgement.

==== Issues of the act ====
The Chinese Exclusion Act caused fear and uncertainty within Chinese communities as a result of immigration raids made legal through the act. During these raids they were at risk of being questioned, detained, or physically or verbally assaulted.

An issue with the Chinese Exclusion Act is that it established 'gatekeeping ideologies' within the US. Demonstrated through the act's mythological approach to restrict, exclude, and deport those believed to be 'undesirable'. The qualities associated with being 'undesirable' were categorized through individuals' race, gender, and class, excluding those who worked to build America, contribute to their economy, and build a home. This was the first American law 'gatekeeping' the country based on those who were not seen as worthy enough to enter based on race.

Another issue was there were many workarounds that people quickly created to bypass the Chinese Exclusion Act. Chinese women would travel to Canada to get a marriage license in order to reunite with their families. Men and women would walk across the American border intending to be arrested, to demand to go to court and claim they were born in America through providing a witness of their birth. While the American and Canadian government did discover these workarounds and new laws were created, these methods still were accessible for several years after the exclusion act.

== Impact ==
A 2024 study found that the legislation harmed the labor market integration of Chinese immigrants in the United States. In response to the discrimination they faced, Chinese immigrants increasingly invested in education, adopted Americanized names, and enhanced their English proficiency. Approximately 300,000 Chinese were able to immigrate to the United States in defiance of the legislation using paper sons.

=== US–China relations ===
In the American effort to change many aspects of the Burlingame Treaty, the US took advantage of China's weakened position on the international stage. China was dealing with various challenging situations, such as the French government establishing a protectorate over Vietnam, which was a tributary country to China for a long time. More importantly, it faced the Senkaku Islands dispute with Japan. When Ex-President Ulysses S. Grant visited China in 1879, Viceroy Li Hongzhang told Grant that if the US helped China pressure the Japanese out of Senkaku Islands, Hongzhang would make a concession on the Chinese immigration issue. This paved the way for the Angell Treaty of 1880, which greatly diminished Chinese immigrants' rights and interests. The Angell Treaty opened the door for the complete prohibition of Chinese immigrants, as politicians realized that the immigrant question was not a priority for the Chinese government, and that China was weak, meaning that even if they were to violate the treaties, China would not invade or create major problems.

Prior to the approval of the act, relations between China and the United States were generally positive. This was mainly because of the Burlingame Treaty, a treaty which included the right of Chinese people to free immigration and travel within the US, and protection of Chinese citizens residing in the United States. Moreover, the treaty gave the two countries reciprocal access to education and schooling when living in the other country. Although the US viewed China as an inferior partner, nevertheless the relationship was positive. American politicians and presidents continued to maintain and uphold the treaty, for example, President Rutherford B. Hayes vetoed bills that contrasted the Burlingame Treaty. As tensions grew domestically in the US however, Hayes began a revision of the Treaty and China agreed to limit immigration to the US. However, once discussions began to enforce the Chinese Exclusion Act, and the law was then passed, "the Chinese Government considered this a direct insult". Furthermore, when the US extended the law to Hawaii and the Philippines in 1902, the Chinese government vehemently objected and citizens organized boycotts and protests.

=== Chinese women ===
The Chinese Exclusion Act had many impacts on Chinese women. As such, unique categories were created in the act to prevent their entry, so that the main way they immigrated was through marrying Chinese or native men. The interrogation was similar to male workers, except they had specific questions regarding bound feet in the early period: women with feet that had been bound tended to be from wealthy families, unbound feet were a sign of being from a low class and so were seen as less desirable by US border officers.

Many women were forced to find alternative immigration methods to be able to reunify with loved ones after the Chinese Exclusion Act. Women would marry or even remarry their partners in Canada so that they were approved for immigration to join their merchant husbands in America. These women navigated and successfully overcame the US government in their many workarounds of the Chinese Exclusion Act. The Chinese Exclusion Act significantly impacted single women. Married women had better chances of immigration due to their merchant husbands. However, for single women it was nearly impossible to immigrate. Often the presumption was if they were single Chinese women they were prostitutes or were to be sold into prostitution. Cross-dressing was a method used by some Chinese women to evade suspicion of immorality at ports of entry, particularly in San Francisco.

=== US education ===
Recruitment of foreign students to US colleges and universities was an important component in the expansion of American influence. International education programs allowed students to learn from the examples provided at elite universities and to bring their newfound skill sets back to their home countries. As such, international education has historically been seen as a vehicle for improving diplomatic relations and promoting trade. However, the Chinese Exclusion Act forced Chinese students attempting to enter the country to provide proof that they were not trying to bypass regulations. Laws and regulations that stemmed from the act made for less than ideal situations for Chinese students, leading to criticisms of American society. Policies and attitudes toward Chinese Americans in the US worked against foreign policy interests by limiting the ability of the US to participate in international education initiatives.

=== US economy ===
The departure of many skilled and unskilled Chinese workers led to an across-the-board decline. Mines and manufacturers in California, where the majority of Chinese immigrants resided, closed and wages did not climb as anticipated. Furthering this, the value of agricultural produce declined due to falling demand reflective of the diminished population. Joaquin Miller remarked in 1901 that since the Chinese departure, property value in Californian cities had remained at a standstill and capital investment had been hesitant.

=== Race-based US legislation ===
The Chinese Exclusion Act was the first legislation that prohibited entry to an immigrant based on race and class. In this way, it facilitated further restriction by both being the model by which future groups could be radicalized as unassimilable aliens, and by also marking a moment where such discrimination could be justifiable. The Chinese Exclusion Act's method of "radicalizing" the Chinese as a threat to America's values and working class, "containing" the danger by limiting their social and geographic mobility, and "defending" America through expulsion became the foundation of America's "gatekeeping" ideology. When the Immigration Act of 1924 placed quotas on all nationalities apart from Northwestern Europe, it can be seen as building off the gatekeeping ideology established with the Chinese Exclusion Act. Public perceptions of many immigrant groups such as Southern and Eastern Europeans in the late 19th and early 20th century became one of "undesirability" when compared to those with Anglo-Saxon heritage, largely due to popular nativity attitudes and accepted racialism. In this way, the restriction of these groups - compared to their Northwestern "desirable" counterparts - continued the discrimination by perceived racial inferiority that started with the Chinese Exclusion Act.

== Repeal and status ==
The Chinese Exclusion Act was repealed by the 1943 Magnuson Act when China had become an ally of the US against Japan in World War II, as the US needed to embody an image of fairness and justice. The Magnuson Act permitted Chinese nationals already residing in the country to become naturalized citizens and stop hiding from the threat of deportation. The act also allowed Chinese people to send remittances to people of Chinese descent living in mainland China, Macau, Hong Kong, and Taiwan and other countries or territories, especially if the funding is not tied to criminal activity. However, the Magnuson Act only allowed a national quota of 105 Chinese immigrants per year and did not repeal the restrictions on immigration from the other Asian countries. The crackdown on Chinese immigrants reached a new level in its last decade, from 1956 to 1965, with the Chinese Confession Program launched by the Immigration and Naturalization Service, that encouraged Chinese who had committed immigration fraud to confess, so as to be eligible for some leniency in treatment. Large-scale Chinese immigration did not occur until the passage of the Immigration and Nationality Act of 1965.

The first Chinese immigrants who entered the United States under the Magnuson Act were college students who sought to escape the warfare in China during World War II and study in the US. The establishment of the People's Republic of China and its entry into the Korean War against the US, however, created a new threat in the minds of some American politicians: American-educated Chinese students bringing American knowledge back to "Red China". Many Chinese college students were almost forcibly naturalized, even though they continued to face significant prejudice, discrimination, and bullying. One of the most prolific of these students was Tsou Tang, who would go on to become the leading expert on China and Sino-American relations during the Cold War.

Although the Chinese Exclusion Act was repealed in 1943, the law in California prohibiting non-whites from marrying whites was not struck down until 1948, in which the California Supreme Court ruled the ban of interracial marriage within the state unconstitutional in Perez v. Sharp. Some other states had such laws until 1967, when the US Supreme Court unanimously ruled in Loving v. Virginia that anti-miscegenation laws across the nation are unconstitutional.

Currently (as of December 2024), although all its constituent sections have long been repealed, Chapter 7 of Title 8 of the United States Code is headed "Exclusion of Chinese". It is the only chapter of the 15 chapters in Title 8 (Aliens and Nationality) that is completely focused on a specific nationality or ethnic group. Like the following Chapter 8, "The Cooly Trade", it consists entirely of statutes that are noted as "Repealed" or "Omitted".

On June 18, 2012, the US House of Representatives passed H.Res. 683, a resolution introduced by Congresswoman Judy Chu which formally expresses the regret of the House of Representatives for the Chinese Exclusion Act. S.Res. 201, a similar resolution, had been approved by the US Senate in October 2011.

In 2014, the California Legislature took formal action to pass measures that formally recognize the accomplishments of Chinese Americans in California and to call upon Congress to formally apologize for the 1882 adoption of the Chinese Exclusion Act. Senate Republican leader Bob Huff (R-Diamond Bar) and incoming Senate president pro-Tem Kevin de León (D-Los Angeles) served as joint authors for Senate Joint Resolution (SJR) 23 and Senate Concurrent Resolution (SCR) 122, respectively.

Both SJR 23 and SCR 122 acknowledge and celebrate the history and contributions of Chinese Americans in California. The resolutions also formally call on Congress to apologize for laws that resulted in the persecution of Chinese Americans, such as the Chinese Exclusion Act.

== See also ==
- Anti-Chinese legislation in the United States
- Chinese Confession Program
- The Chinese Exclusion Act, a 2018 television documentary film from PBS
- Anti-Chinese sentiment
- Los Angeles Chinese massacre of 1871
- Lost Years: A People's Struggle for Justice (2011)
- Lau Ow Bew v. United States, which held that returning merchants did not need paperwork from China.
- List of United States immigration laws
- Naturalization Act of 1798
- Paper sons
- Rock Springs massacre
- Stop Asian Hate
- Stop AAPI Hate
- United States v. Wong Kim Ark, which held that the Chinese Exclusion Act could not overrule the citizenship of those born in the U.S. to Chinese parents
- Yellow Peril
- Chinese Immigration Act, 1885, Canada
- Chinese Americans
- Executive Order 13769
- Page Act of 1875
