= Chinatowns in the United States =

Ethnic Chinese enclaves in the United States

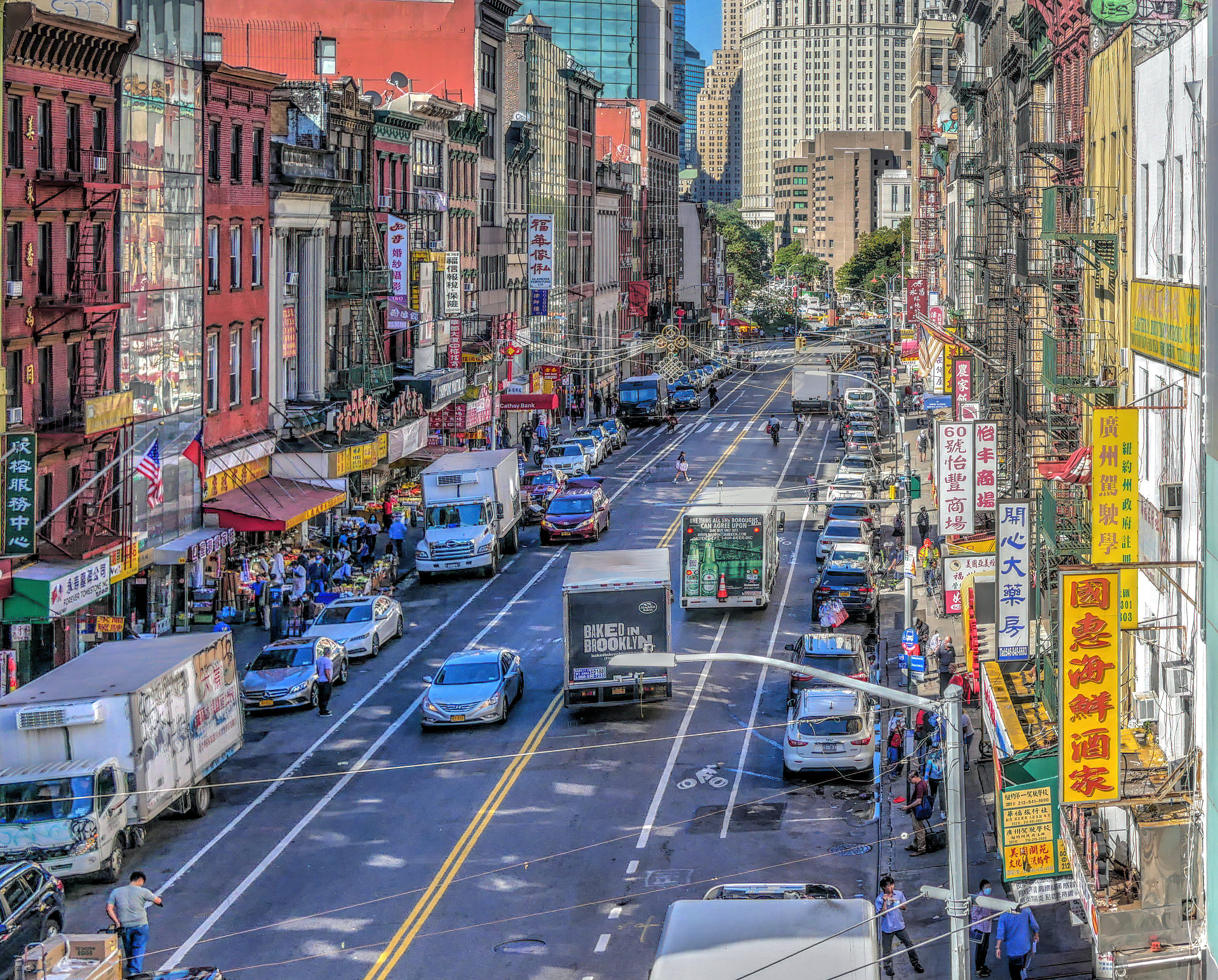
- Chinatown, Manhattan, the highest concentration of Chinese people outside Asia.
- Chinese: 唐人街
- Literal meaning: "Chinese Street"
Transcriptions
Standard Mandarin
- Hanyu Pinyin: Tángrénjiē
Wu
- Romanization: Daon^{平} nin^{平} ka^{平}
Hakka
- Romanization: Tongˇ nginˇ gieˊ
Yue: Cantonese
- Yale Romanization: Tòhngyàhngāai
- Jyutping: Tong^{2} jan^{2} gaai^{1}
Southern Min
- Hokkien POJ: Tông-jîn-ke
Eastern Min
- Fuzhou BUC: Tòng-ìng-kĕ

Alternative Chinese name
- Traditional Chinese: 中國城
- Simplified Chinese: 中国城
- Literal meaning: "Chinatown"
Transcriptions
Standard Mandarin
- Hanyu Pinyin: Zhōngguóchéng
Wu
- Romanization: Tson^{平} koh^{入} zen^{平}
Hakka
- Romanization: Zungˊ guedˋ sangˇ
Yue: Cantonese
- Yale Romanization: Jūnggwoksìhng
- Jyutping: Jung^{1} gwok^{3} sing^{4}
Southern Min
- Hokkien POJ: Tiong-kok-siânn
Eastern Min
- Fuzhou BUC: Dŭng-guók-siàng

Second alternative Chinese name
- Traditional Chinese: 華埠
- Simplified Chinese: 华埠
- Literal meaning: "Chinese District"
Transcriptions
Standard Mandarin
- Hanyu Pinyin: Huábù
Wu
- Romanization: Gho^{平} bu^{去}
Hakka
- Romanization: Faˇ pu
Yue: Cantonese
- Yale Romanization: Wàhfauh
- Jyutping: Wa^{4} fau^{6}
Southern Min
- Hokkien POJ: Hôa-bú
Eastern Min
- Fuzhou BUC: Huà-pú

Chinatowns are enclaves of Chinese people outside of China. The first Chinatown in the United States was San Francisco's Chinatown in 1848, and many other Chinatowns were established in the 19th century by the Chinese diaspora on the West Coast. By 1875, Chinatowns had emerged in eastern cities such as New York City, Boston, Pittsburgh, and Philadelphia. The Chinese Exclusion Act of 1882 barred Chinese immigration to the United States, but the Magnuson Act of 1943 repealed it, and the population of Chinatowns began to rise again.

Many historic Chinatowns have lost their status as ethnic Chinese enclaves due to gentrification and demographic shifts, while others have become major tourist attractions. New York City, San Francisco, and Los Angeles have the largest Chinese populations in the United States, and the Chinatowns in New York City are some of the largest Chinese enclaves outside of Asia.

== History ==
The earliest Chinatowns in the United States were founded on the West Coast during the 19th century, spurred on by the California Gold Rush. The Emancipation Proclamation in 1863 opened up new opportunities for Chinese people in the Southern United States. As Chinese immigrants started moving eastward, drawn by labor needs for the transcontinental railroad, newer Chinatowns emerged by 1875 in cities such as New York, Philadelphia, and Boston. Racial and labor tensions led to incidents such as the Rock Springs Massacre and Hells Canyon Massacre. In 1882, US President Chester A. Arthur signed the Chinese Exclusion Act into law, which banned Chinese immigration into the United States.

The Chinese Exclusion Act was repealed by the Magnuson Act in 1943, and Chinatown populations began to rise again.

Continuous demographic changes have drastically altered some Chinatowns. Large metropolitan areas such as New York City continue to see large-scale immigration from mainland China, while other Chinatowns are no longer the ethnic enclaves they once were.

== Demographics ==
Most Chinatowns started as enclaves of ethnic Chinese people, but many of these Chinatowns have experienced gentrification and demographic shifts. While some Chinatowns have retained their status as ethnic Chinese enclaves, many have lost that status. The cities with the ten highest Chinese-American populations, according to the 2015 American Community Survey, were as follows

1. New York City (549,181)
2. San Francisco (179,644)
3. Los Angeles (County) (including San Gabriel Valley core cities and CDPs (225,543), and in Los Angeles (city) an additional 77,284)
4. San Jose (72,141)
5. Honolulu (53,119)
6. Chicago (51,809)
7. San Diego (40,033)
8. Philadelphia (35,732)
9. Oakland (33,818)
10. Houston (32,968)

== By state ==
=== Arizona ===
==== Phoenix ====
The Phoenix Chinatown started in the 1870s, and lasted until the 1940s, by which time the Chinese population had scattered throughout the city. Sources from a research project indicated that more than one Chinatown existed in Phoenix, with one around First Street and Madison Street, and a second at First Street and Adams Street at the present location of the Talking Stick Resort Arena.

===== Mesa =====
In the early 2000s, a two-mile (3.2 km) stretch of Dobson Road in Mesa, one of Phoenix's southeastern suburbs, had developed with, as of March 2022, over 70 Asian-themed restaurants, grocery stores, and other businesses on Dobson Road.

Metro Phoenix Chinese/Asian areas
1 Chinatown (c. 1870-1890)
2 Chinatown (c. 1890-1950)
3 Chinese Cultural Center, Phoenix (1997–2017)
4 Mesa Asian district (c. 2000–present)

=== California ===
Given its relative proximity to East Asia and Southeast Asia, California has the most historical and present Chinatowns of any U.S. state.

==== Eureka ====
A Chinatown was founded in Eureka in the 1880s. It spanned a block at Fourth and E streets.

==== Fresno ====
Fresno has a near-downtown neighborhood officially called Chinatown. Though it had a vibrant Chinese community in the early 1900s, most of its Chinese businesses and architecture are gone.

==== Greater Los Angeles area ====
===== Anaheim =====
Anaheim was the first incorporated city in Orange County. It was founded in 1857 by a group of German immigrants associated with the Los Angeles Vineyard Society. Initially, the settlers hired approximately sixty Mexican and Indigenous laborers to construct a six-mile irrigation canal connecting the Santa Ana River to their new wine-making enterprise. Dissatisfied with this workforce, the German settlers later traveled to San Francisco to recruit thirty Chinese laborers.

Amalie Frohling, an early Anaheim settler, wrote in her 1914 memoir that the Chinese workers were “industrious, peaceful, never drunk, and kept cleaner in body than the Indians.” Each Chinese laborer was compensated with a town lot, and these parcels later formed the spatial foundation of Anaheim’s early Chinatown.

Over time, Anaheim’s Chinese population grew to become the second-largest ethnic group in the city, after the German community. Chinese immigrants planted hundreds of thousands of grapevines, excavated the sixteen-mile Cajon Canal from the Anaheim Union Reservoir (now located within Tri-City Regional Park in Placentia), constructed some of Orange County’s earliest railroads, and worked extensively in the region’s agricultural fields. Several Chinese physicians provided medical care within Anaheim’s Chinatown, while others operated vegetable businesses and laundries, contributing to the city’s early economic and social development.

Despite these contributions, Anaheim’s Chinese community began to decline following the implementation of the Chinese Exclusion Act of 1882. This decline was further accelerated by anti-Chinese violence in Orange County and racially motivated boycotts of Chinese-owned businesses. After 1910, Chinese residents gradually left the area, and by 1935, only one Chinese resident remained in Anaheim.

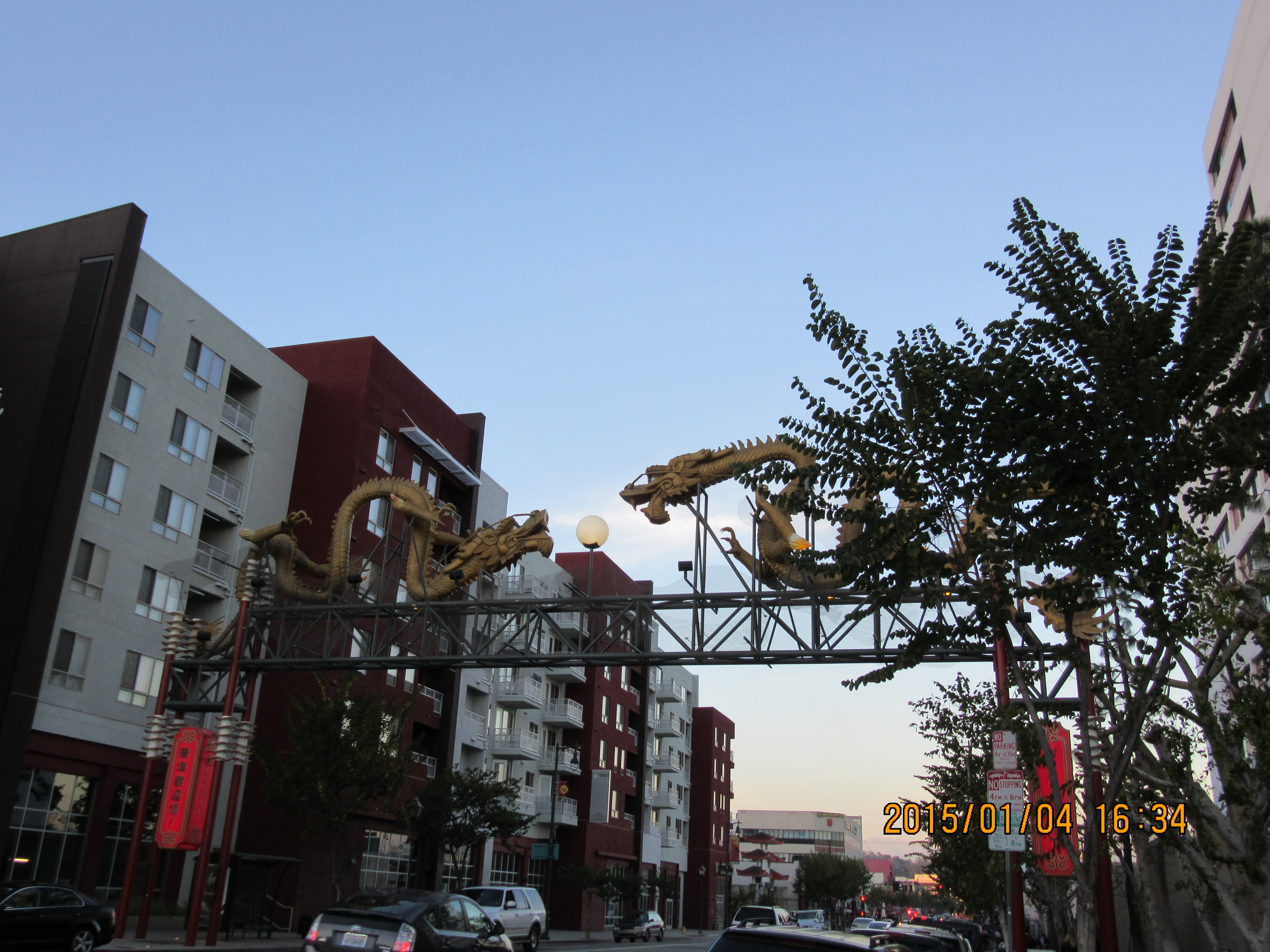
The entrance arch at the Los Angeles's Chinatown

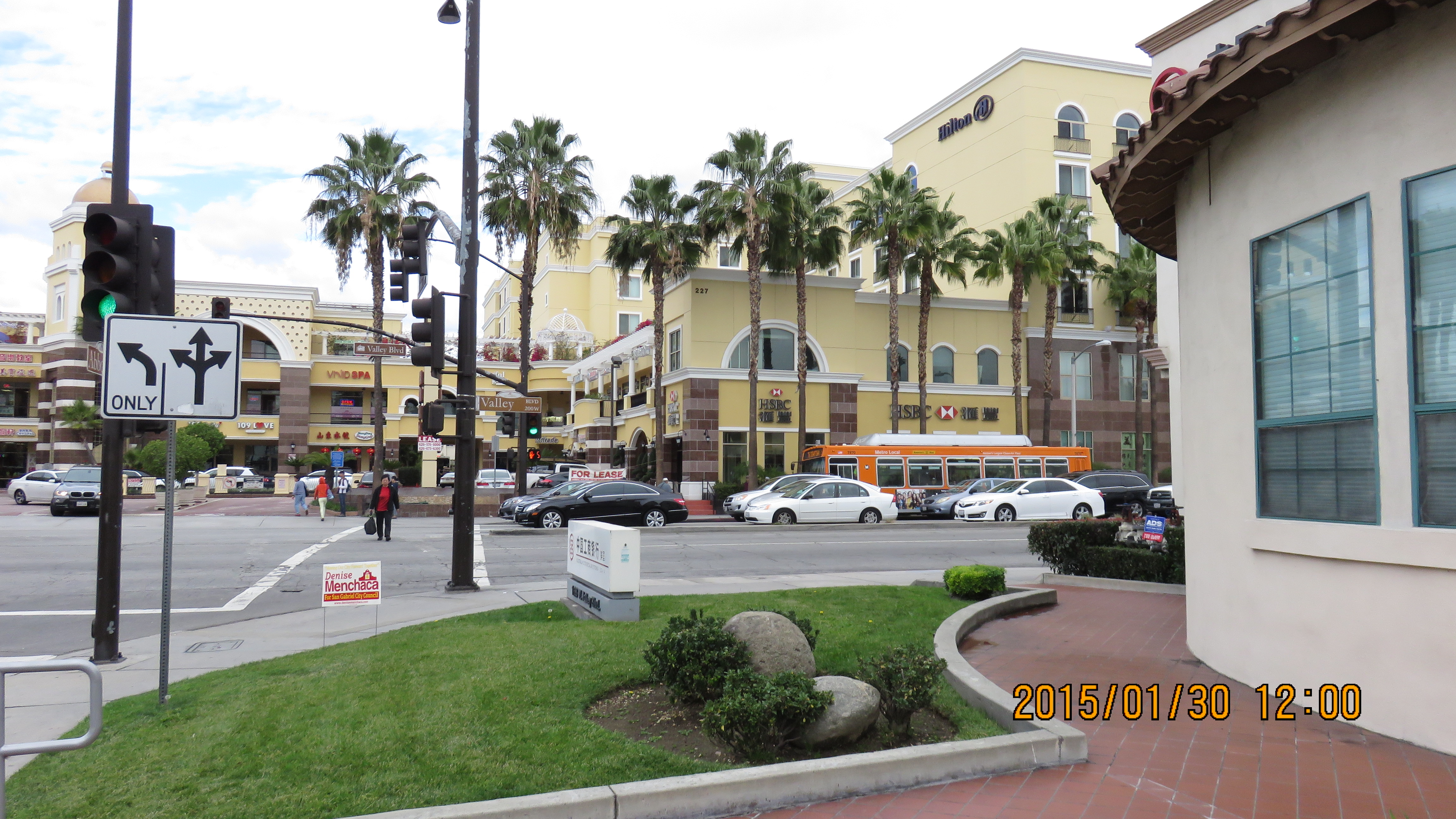
Hilton Square in San Gabriel, California

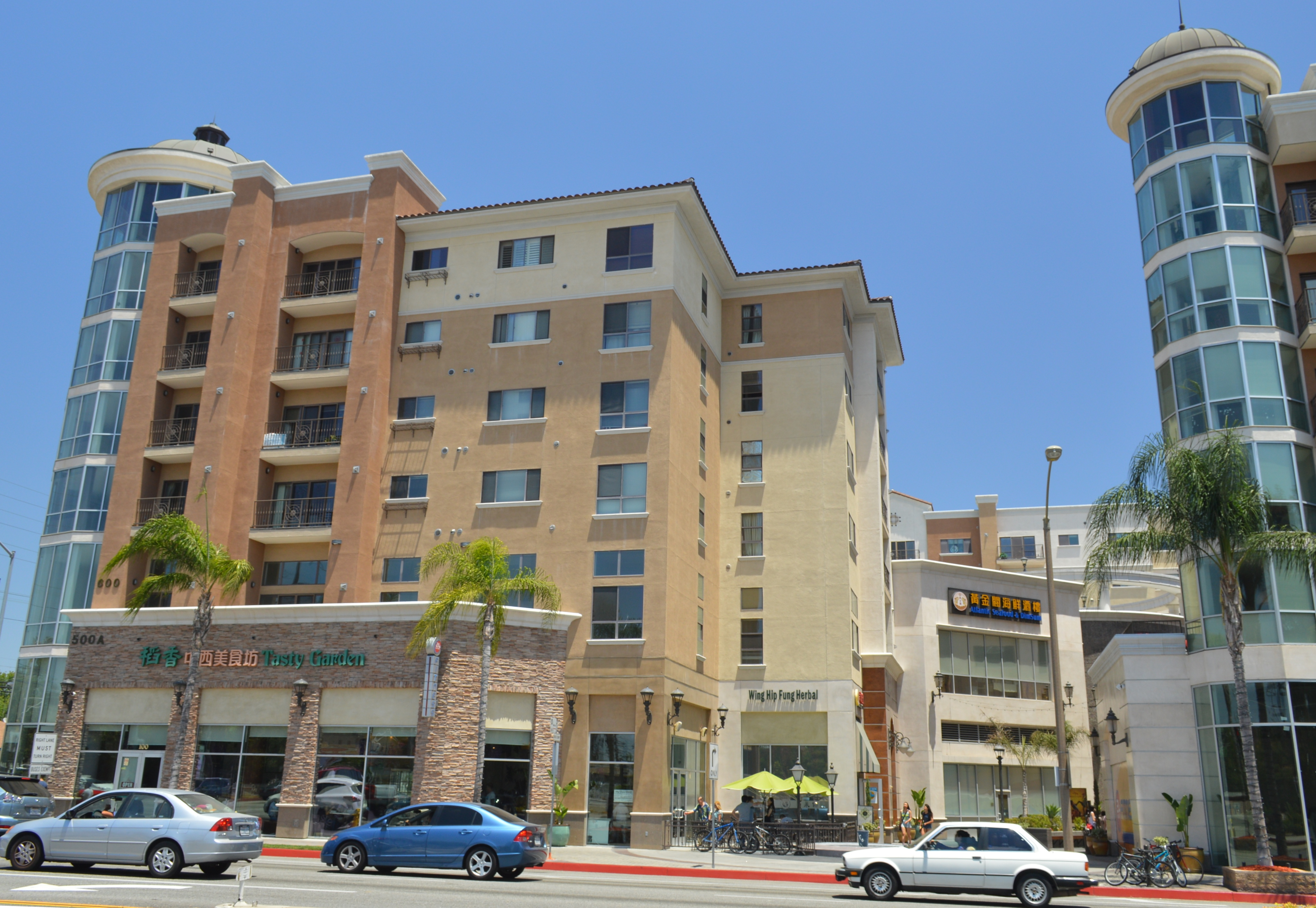
Atlantic Times Square in Monterey Park, California

===== Cerritos =====
Cerritos is a majority Asian city located on the border of Orange County and Los Angeles County. There are significant Chinese-owned and operated businesses along South Street that continue into the neighboring city of Artesia.

===== Chino Hills =====
Chino Hills is a suburban city located on the border of Los Angeles County and San Bernardino County. It is growing as a continuation of the Chinese community in San Gabriel Valley and is known for its high-performing schools and clean environment.

===== Irvine =====
Irvine is a suburban Chinatown in Orange County that is growing as more Chinese people move into the San Gabriel Valley. Many Chinese business establishments are situated in the El Camino Real and Walnut neighborhoods.

===== Little Saigon =====
Little Saigon is a district located in north-central Orange County. The majority of the population is Vietnamese. Many of the Vietnamese are of mixed Chinese origin, especially Cantonese, as many Chinese-Vietnamese families fled Vietnam at the end of the Vietnam War. Many of the older residents can still speak Cantonese, and Chinese-style restaurants are also common in the area, including Cantonese barbeque butchers. This area is centered on Westminster, Garden Grove, Midway City, and Fountain Valley, while also including a presence in the neighboring cities of Santa Ana, Anaheim, Stanton, and Huntington Beach.

===== Los Angeles =====
The present-day Chinatown in Los Angeles was founded in the late 1930s as the second Chinatown in the city. Formerly a "Little Italy," it is presently located along Hill Street, Broadway, and Spring Street near Dodger Stadium in downtown Los Angeles with restaurants, grocers, and tourist-oriented shops and plazas. A sculpture of dueling gold dragons spans Broadway and marks the entrance to Chinatown, with a statue honoring Dr. Sun Yat-sen, founder of the Kuomintang, adorning the northeastern section. The enclave contains Buddhist temples, a Chinese Christian church (with services conducted in Cantonese), and Thien Hau Temple, a temple dedicated to the Chinese goddess of the sea that caters to Chinese and Vietnamese worshipers. Chinatown is home to family and regional associations and service organizations for long-time immigrants, as well as ones founded by and for a second wave of Indochina-born immigrants after the Vietnam War ended.

===== San Gabriel Valley =====
The San Gabriel Valley in the eastern suburbs of Los Angeles is home to the U.S.'s first suburban Chinatown (in Monterey Park, California), and now includes Chinese enclaves in the San Gabriel Valley. The Chinese population in the neighborhood began to rise starting in 1977, when developer Frederic Hsieh bought up multiple properties in an effort to create what he described would be a "mecca for Chinese". It is considered a "new Chinatown". There are now approximately 15 local cities and communities with Chinese plurality: Alhambra, Arcadia, Diamond Bar, East San Gabriel, Hacienda Heights, Mayflower Village, Monterey Park, North El Monte, Rosemead, Rowland Heights, San Gabriel, San Marino, South San Gabriel, Temple City, Walnut.

===== Ventura =====
Ventura had a flourishing Chinese settlement in the early 1880s. The largest concentration of activity, known as China Alley, was across Main Street from the Mission San Buenaventura. China Alley was parallel with Main Street and extended east off Figueroa Street between Main and Santa Clara Streets. The city council has designated the China Alley Historic Area a point of interest in the downtown business district.

==== Hanford ====
Hanford has a historic Chinese alley for display and visitation to this day, which started off in the 1800s as a place of Chinese settlers. Two Chinese restaurants still exist in the area. China Alley was listed as one of the 11 most endangered historic places in America in 2011.

==== Locke ====
The Sacramento River delta town of Locke was built in 1915 as a distinct rural Chinese enclave. A thriving agricultural community in the early 20th century, it is no longer predominantly Chinese. A historic district of 50 wood-frame buildings along Main Street, Key Street and River Road was designated a historic district in 1990.

==== Sacramento ====
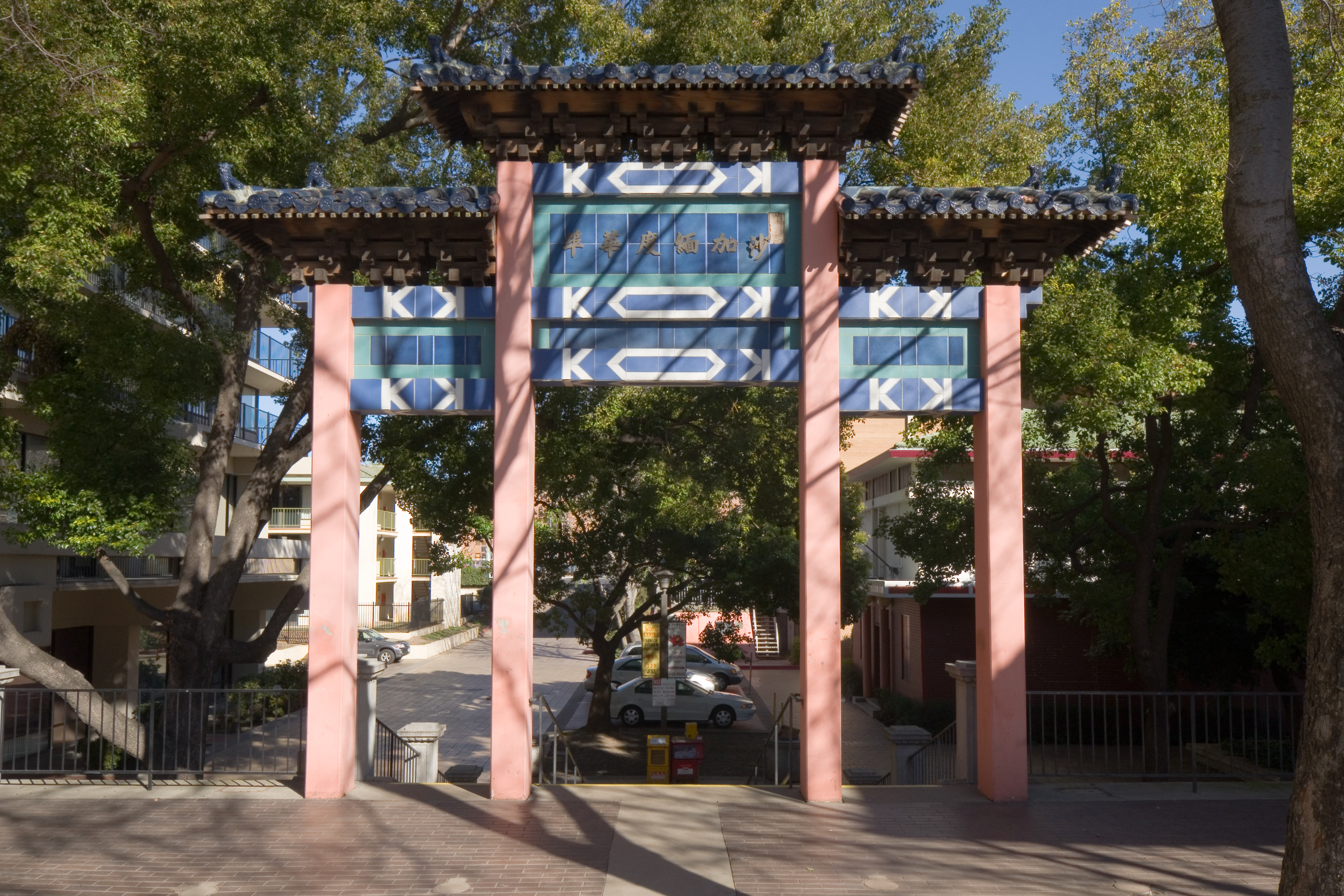
Paifang at Sacramento's Chinatown Mall

Throughout the early 1840s and 1850s, China was at war with Great Britain and France in the First and Second Opium Wars. The wars, along with endemic poverty in China, helped drive many Chinese immigrants to America. Many first came to San Francisco, which was then the largest city in California, which was known as "Dai Fow" (The Big City) and some came eventually to Sacramento (then the second-largest city in California), which is known as "Yee Fow" (Second City). Many of these immigrants came in hopes for a better life as well as the possibility of finding gold in the foothills east of Sacramento.

Sacramento's Chinatown was located on I Street from Second to Sixth Streets. At the time, this area of I Street was considered a health hazard because it was located in a levee zone and was lower than other parts of the city. Throughout the history of Sacramento's Chinatown, there were fires, acts of discrimination, and prejudicial legislation such as the Chinese Exclusion Act. Ordinances on what was viable building material were set into place to try to prevent Chinese settlement. Newspapers wrote stories that portrayed the Chinese in an unfavorable light to inspire ethnic discrimination and drive the Chinese away. As the years passed, a railroad was built through parts of the Chinatown. While the east side of the country fought for higher wages and fewer working hours, many cities in the western United States wanted the Chinese out, believing that they were stealing jobs from the white working class.

==== Salinas ====
In the 1880s, farm labor in Salinas was performed by many Chinese immigrants. Salinas had the second largest Chinatown in the state, slightly smaller than San Francisco.

==== San Diego ====
San Diego's Chinatown was founded in the 1870s in the Stingaree neighborhood downtown. Not long after the Industrial Workers of the World began getting a foothold among the working class in the area, the population were suppressed by town ordinances, violent police actions and ultimately, the demolition of over 120 structures. In 1987, the city council of San Diego redeveloped the area and officially designated part of the newly renamed Gaslamp Quarter the Asian Pacific Thematic Historic District. The annual San Diego Chinese New Year Food and Cultural Faire is held in this district, and the San Diego Chinese Heritage Museum is located there.

==== San Francisco Bay Area ====
===== San Francisco =====
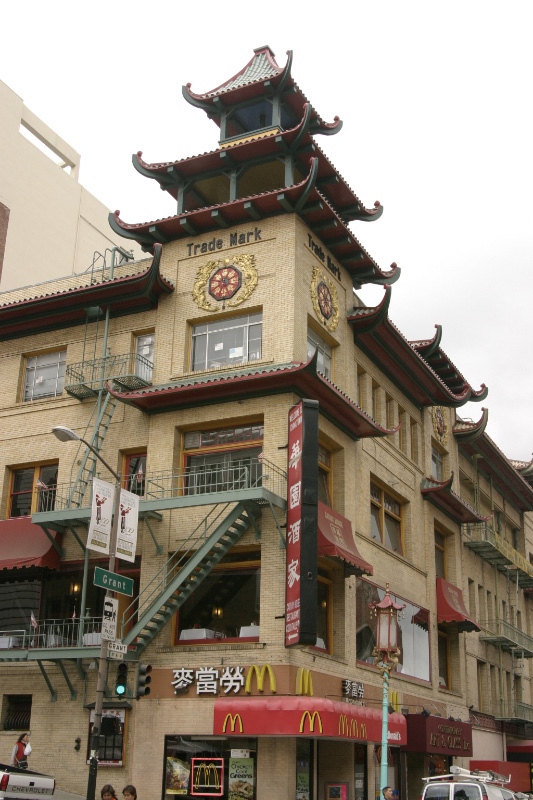
Distinctive Chinese-style architecture characterizes the streets of San Francisco's historic Chinatown, one of the oldest and largest in the United States.

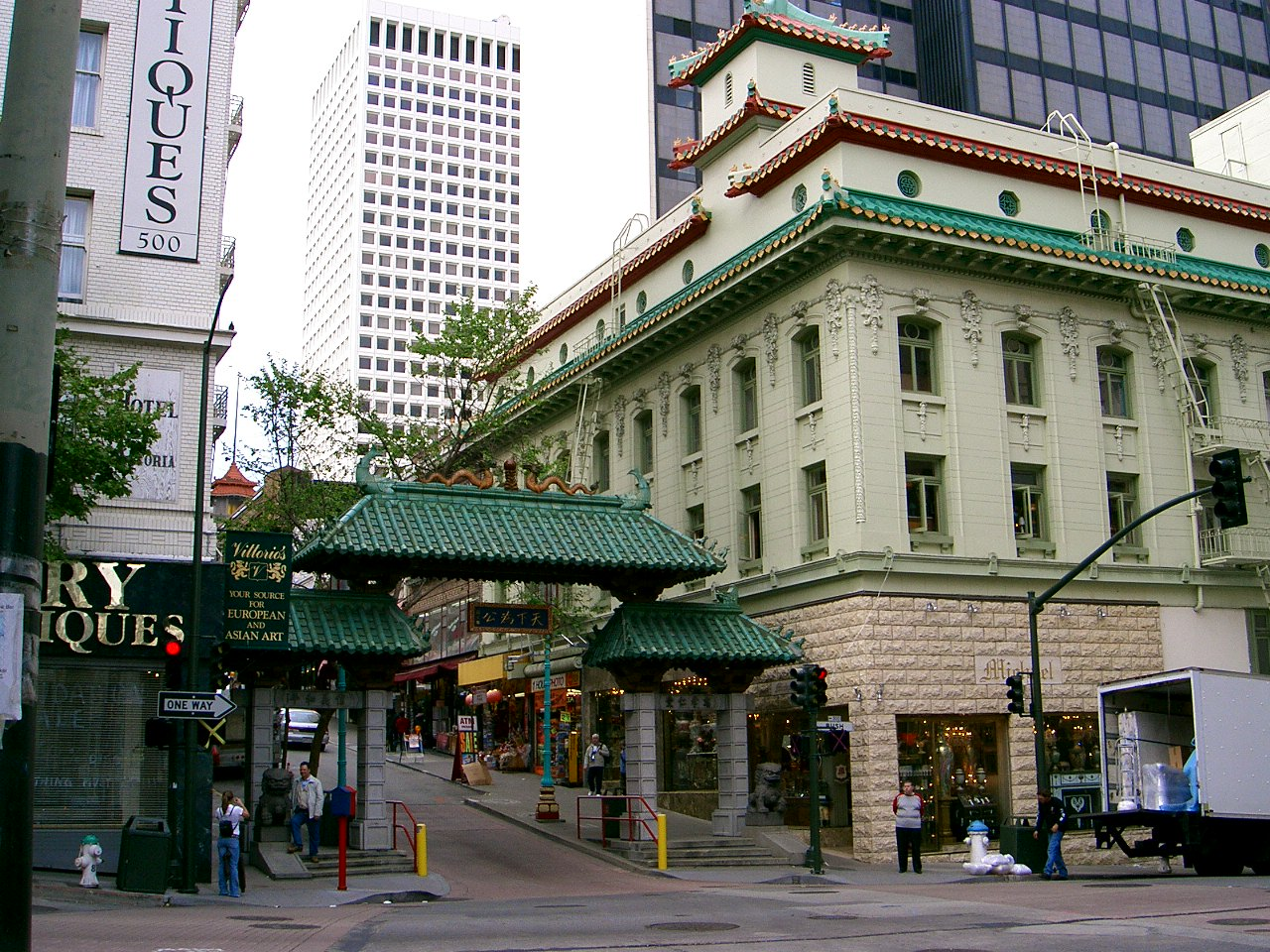
Dragon Gate, a paifang at San Francisco's Chinatown

The first and one of the largest Chinatowns in the Americas is San Francisco's Chinatown. Founded in 1848, Chinatown was destroyed in the 1906 San Francisco earthquake and was later rebuilt and re-realized, using a Chinese-style architecture that has been criticized as garish and touristy. For many years, a center of tong wars and gang activity, Chinatown is now much safer than it was in years past. Chinatown receives millions of tourists annually, making the community, along with Alcatraz and Golden Gate Bridge, one of the prime attractions and highlights of the city of San Francisco, as well as the centerpiece of Chinese-American history.

Besides the main north–south thoroughfares of Grant Avenue and Stockton Street, connected by several intersecting side streets, Chinatown has many small alleys, including Ross Alley. Contained within this alley is a mix of touristy stores, a tiny barbershop, and a fortune cookie factory. Ross Alley used to have brothels, but they no longer exist. Also within the confines of Chinatown is the Woh Hei Yuen Recreation Center and Park on Powell Street. The Tin How Temple (Queen of Heaven and Goddess of the Seven Seas) on Waverly Place, which was founded in 1852, is the oldest Chinese temple in the United States.

The San Francisco Chinatown hosts the largest Chinese New Year parade in the Americas, with corporate sponsors such as the Bank of America and the award-winning and widely praised dragon dance team from the San Francisco Police Department, composed solely of Chinese-American SFPD officers (the only such team in existence in the United States). As Chinatown and many Chinese-Americans in the San Francisco Bay Area have historical or current roots in the province of Guangdong, China (particularly Taishan County) and in Hong Kong, these dances are mostly performed in the southern Chinese style. San Francisco's Chinatown is also the birthplace of chop suey and many other dishes of American Chinese cuisine.

With its Chinatown as the landmark, the city of San Francisco itself has one of the largest and predominant concentrations of Chinese-American population centers, representing 20% of total population as of the 2000 Census, Though Chinatown remains the cultural and symbolic anchor of the Bay Area Chinese community, increasing numbers of Chinese-Americans do not live there, instead residing in Chinese enclaves in the Richmond and Sunset districts, or elsewhere in the Bay Area.

===== Oakland =====
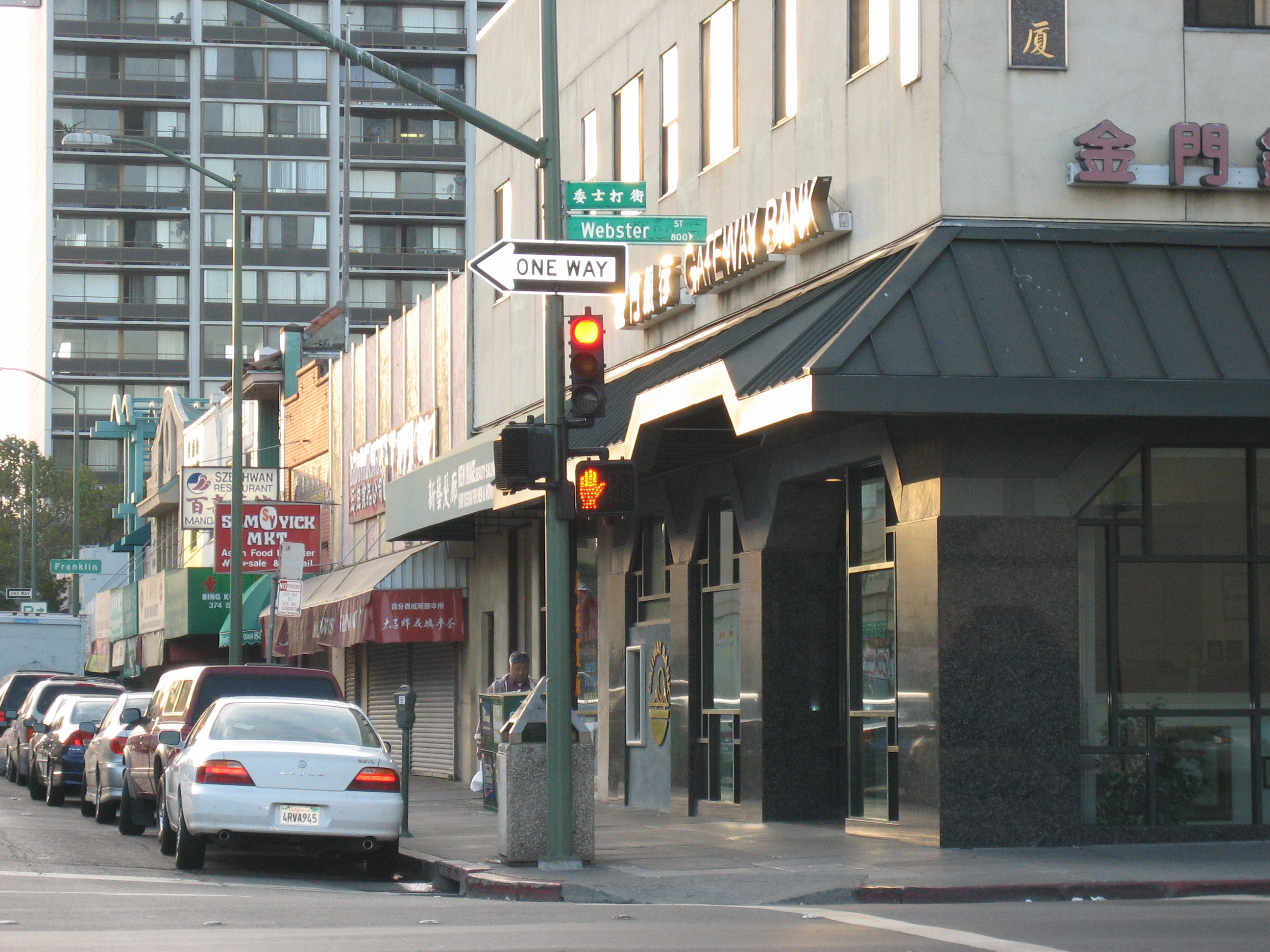
Chinatown, Oakland

Originally formed in the 1860s, the Chinatown of Oakland – centering upon 8th Street and Webster Street – shares a long history as its counterpart in the city of San Francisco as Oakland's community remains one of the focal points of Chinese American heritage in the San Francisco Bay Area. Oakland's Chinatown relies less on tourism than the Chinatown in San Francisco, although the local government has promoted it as such as it is considered one of the top sources of sales tax revenue for the city. The Chinatown does not have an ornamental entrance arch (paifang) but the streets of the community are adorned with bilingual road signs in English and Chinese.

Today, while it remains a Cantonese-speaking enclave, it is not exclusively Chinese anymore, but more of a pan-Asian neighborhood which reflects Oakland's diversity of Asian communities, including Chinese, Vietnamese, Korean, Filipinos, Japanese, Cambodian, Laotian, Mien, Thai, and others. In addition to the standard Chinese New Year festivities, the Oakland Chinatown Streetfest (held by the Oakland Chinatown Chamber of Commerce) is held yearly in August and features Chinese lion dances, parades, music, cooking demonstrations and contests, a food festival, and various activities.

===== Daly City, Peninsula =====
Daly City as well as the San Francisco Peninsula is home to a hefty Chinese population. Daly City is about 35% Chinese, and South San Francisco and Millbrae southward both have Chinese populations above 15%.

===== Napa =====
Napa had a Chinatown that was established in the mid-1800s, located on First Street. It had 300 residents. Many of its residents provided manual labor in the area.

===== San Jose area =====
San Jose was home to five Chinatowns that existed until the 1930s. The initial Chinatowns in San Jose were frequently burned down by arson. Another Chinatown was excavated during an urban renewal project to build the Fairmont Hotel and Silicon Valley Financial Center on Market and San Fernando Streets. This Chinatown was also known as the "Plaza Street Chinatown", which grew rapidly from the 1860s to the 1870s and was home to "several hundred Chinese". The area was subject to racial tensions, as white residents often complained to the city council that it was "bothersome". By 1870, the area was burned to the ground and many Chinese were evicted from the area as the anti-Chinese public sentiment grew.

Later in history, John Heinlen, a farmer and businessman, planned a six block Chinatown with brick structures with water and pipes in the area of Sixth Street and Cleveland Street in 1887, to the dismay of the non-Chinese public. The area was then known as "Heinlenville" and contained a variety of merchants, barbers, traditional doctors, and Chinese herbal medicine, and the Ng Shing Gung temple. The area was surrounded by Little Italy and co-existed harmoniously, but then dwindled in the 1920s as the younger generations sought careers outside the area and with a lack of new Chinese coming in due to the Chinese Exclusion Act. The area eventually lost almost all of its Chinese population. Some artifacts from this Chinatown are now located in Kelley Park. At the time, an existing Japantown nearby was evacuated due to the war, but was repopulated after the internment of the Japanese-Americans.

The city of Cupertino has a substantial Chinese and Taiwanese community; many of whom work for Apple, Inc. and other area technology based industries. Other nearby cities such as Fremont, Sunnyvale, and Santa Clara have large Chinese populations.

==== San Luis Obispo ====
San Luis Obispo had a Chinatown beginning in the 1870s.

==== Santa Barbara ====
Santa Barbara had a small (about 250 people) but flourishing Chinatown from at least 1868, when Chinese workers arrived from the San Francisco Bay Area to help construct the San Marcos Pass Stagecoach Road between Santa Barbara and Santa Ynez Valley. Chinatown in Santa Barbara was located mostly on E Canon Perdido Street in downtown Santa Barbara.

==== Santa Rosa ====
There was a Chinatown in Santa Rosa, present in the early 1900s, and was removed afterward. It was located on Second and Third Streets, near Santa Rosa Avenue, in downtown Santa Rosa. The district had around 200 residents.

==== Stockton ====
Stockton, California is home to a small Chinatown on Chung Wah Lane, East Market Street and East Washington Street. It briefly became the largest Chinatown in California in the aftermath of the 1906 San Francisco earthquake as many displaced Chinese residents fled to Stockton.

On Lock Sam, the city's oldest restaurant was founded in 1898. The community was once quite large but, after development in the 1950s and 1960s and the construction of the Crosstown freeway, businesses moved, buildings were demolished, new buildings were built, and the community changed forever. There is still a Chinese New Year Parade merged with the Vietnamese New Year celebrations.

=== Colorado ===
==== Denver ====
Chinatown in Denver, Colorado, was a neighborhood on Wazee Street in what is now the "LoDo section of the city...." The first recorded Chinese person was of a man from southern China named "John" dated June 29, 1869, as documented by the Colorado Tribune. It was also referred to as "Hop Alley", but was torn apart by riots in the 1880s.

=== Connecticut ===
==== Norwich and Montville ====
After the September 11 attacks led to a loss of garment and service jobs in Manhattan's Chinatown, many Chinese Americans relocated to Montville and Norwich in Connecticut to work in the newly opened Mohegan Sun casino, creating an unofficial suburban Chinatown. The influx of new residents led to some tensions with the existing population.

=== District of Columbia ===
Chinatown in Washington, D.C. is a small, historical neighborhood east of downtown consisting of about 20 ethnic Chinese and other Asian restaurants and small businesses along H and I Streets between 5th and 8th Streets, Northwest. It is known for its annual Chinese New Year festival and parade and the Friendship Arch, a Chinese gate built over H Street at 7th Street. Other nearby prominent landmarks include the Capital One Arena, a sports and entertainment arena, and the Old Patent Office Building, which houses two of the Smithsonian museums (the National Portrait Gallery and the Smithsonian American Art Museum). The neighborhood is served by the Gallery Place-Chinatown station of the Washington Metro.

=== Florida ===
==== Orlando ====
In 2003, Chinese investors turned the Westside Crossing Plaza, which housed a Publix, into the location for Greater Orlando's Chinatown, consisting of spaces for up to 60 Asian businesses. Located at 5060 West Colonial Drive, the sprawling strip mall features a paifang, built in 2013, and a monument commemorating Sun Yat Sen unveiled in 2012. Today, it consists of a collection of Chinese, Vietnamese, and Korean restaurants and businesses, with a central supermarket: Enson Market.

=== Georgia ===
==== Atlanta area ====
Atlanta has remnants of historic Chinese district, and a large Chinese and other Asian, especially Korean, population resides in Alpharetta and Johns Creek. Atlanta also has a Chinatown located in a shopping mall.

=== Hawaii ===
==== Honolulu ====
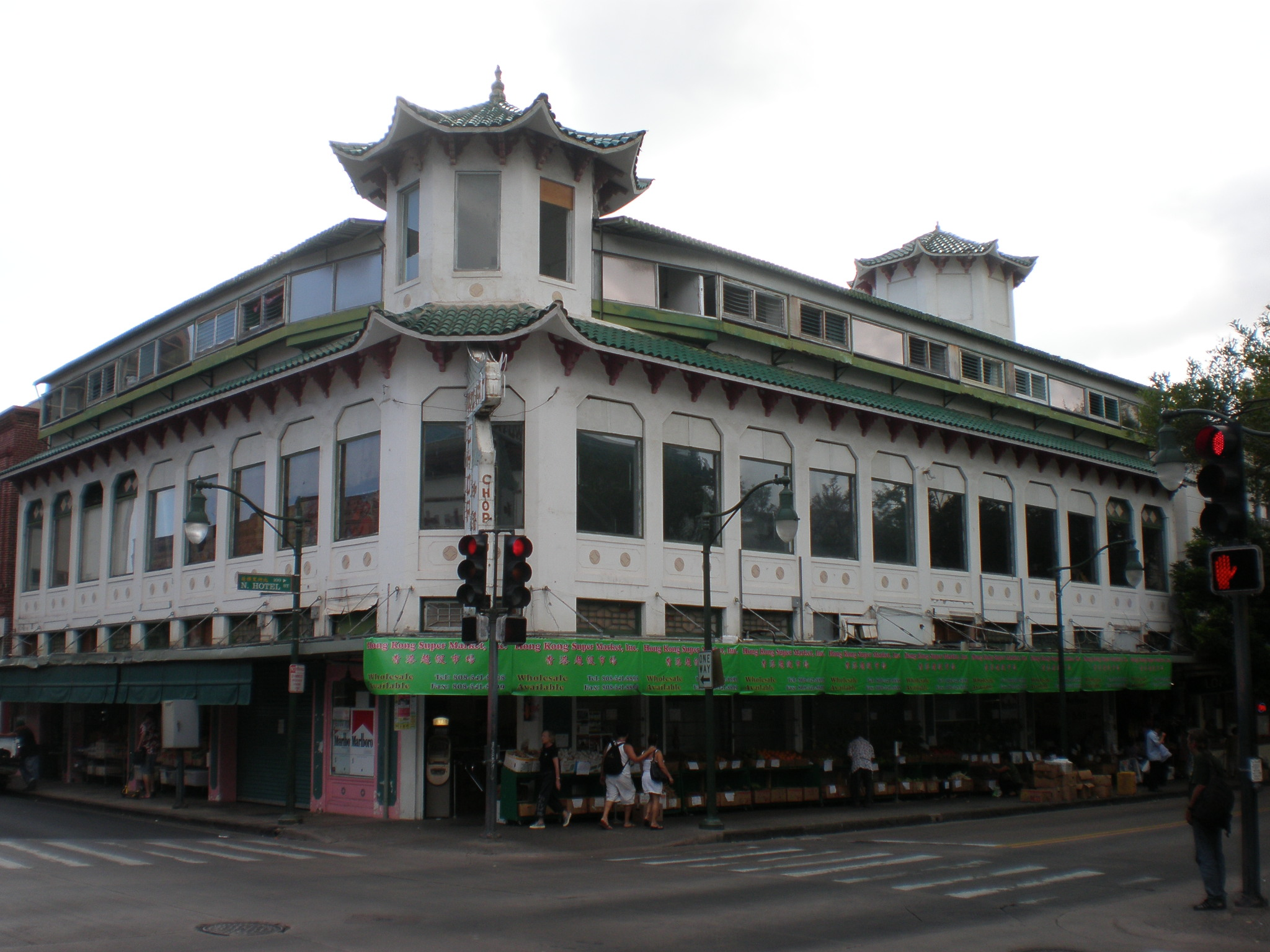
The Wo Fat Building in the Chinatown district of Honolulu.

The official historical and current Chinatown of Honolulu, Hawaii is located near North Hotel Street and Maunakea Street and contains traditional Chinese businesses. Unlike Chinatowns in the continental United States which were largely established by immigrants from Taishan, Honolulu's Chinatown was started in the 1890s by early settlers from Zhongshan, Guangdong Province. They migrated to Hawaii for work on the islands' sugarcane plantations and rice fields, and many became successful merchants and relocated to the city of Honolulu. As with many other Chinatowns in the United States, it was noted for its unsanitary conditions throughout the 19th century, including an outbreak of bubonic plague in 1899. For a period after the 1940s, it degenerated into a red-light district.

Today, it is a diverse neighborhood with many East Asian and Pacific Islander businesses. Recent investment and planning has dramatically transformed the once decaying and unsafe neighborhood into an upscale Asian-inspired arts and business district, blending the traditional Chinese bazaars and family owned stores. Ethnic Chinese people from Vietnam make up much of the population. Businesses include markets, bakeries, a Chinese porcelain shop, and shops specializing in ginseng herbal remedies. There are often bazaars and street peddlers in the Kekaulike Market located on Kekaulike Street. A variety of restaurants serving Hong Kong-style dim sum and Vietnamese beef noodle soup are common.

Chinese revolutionary Sun Yat-sen received his Western education in Hawaii, and his history is tied to Honolulu's Chinatown. The area once served as his base of operations for a series of crusades against the ruling Qing Dynasty in China that culminated in the Revolution of 1911. There is a monument to Sun in Honolulu's Chinatown, and the Dr. Sun Yat-sen Memorial Park is named in his honor.

=== Idaho ===
==== Boise ====
The historical Chinatown of Boise, Idaho existed from around the 1870s to the 1960s. It was located along Idaho Street, and east from 8th Street along Front Street and Grove Street.

=== Illinois ===
==== Chicago ====
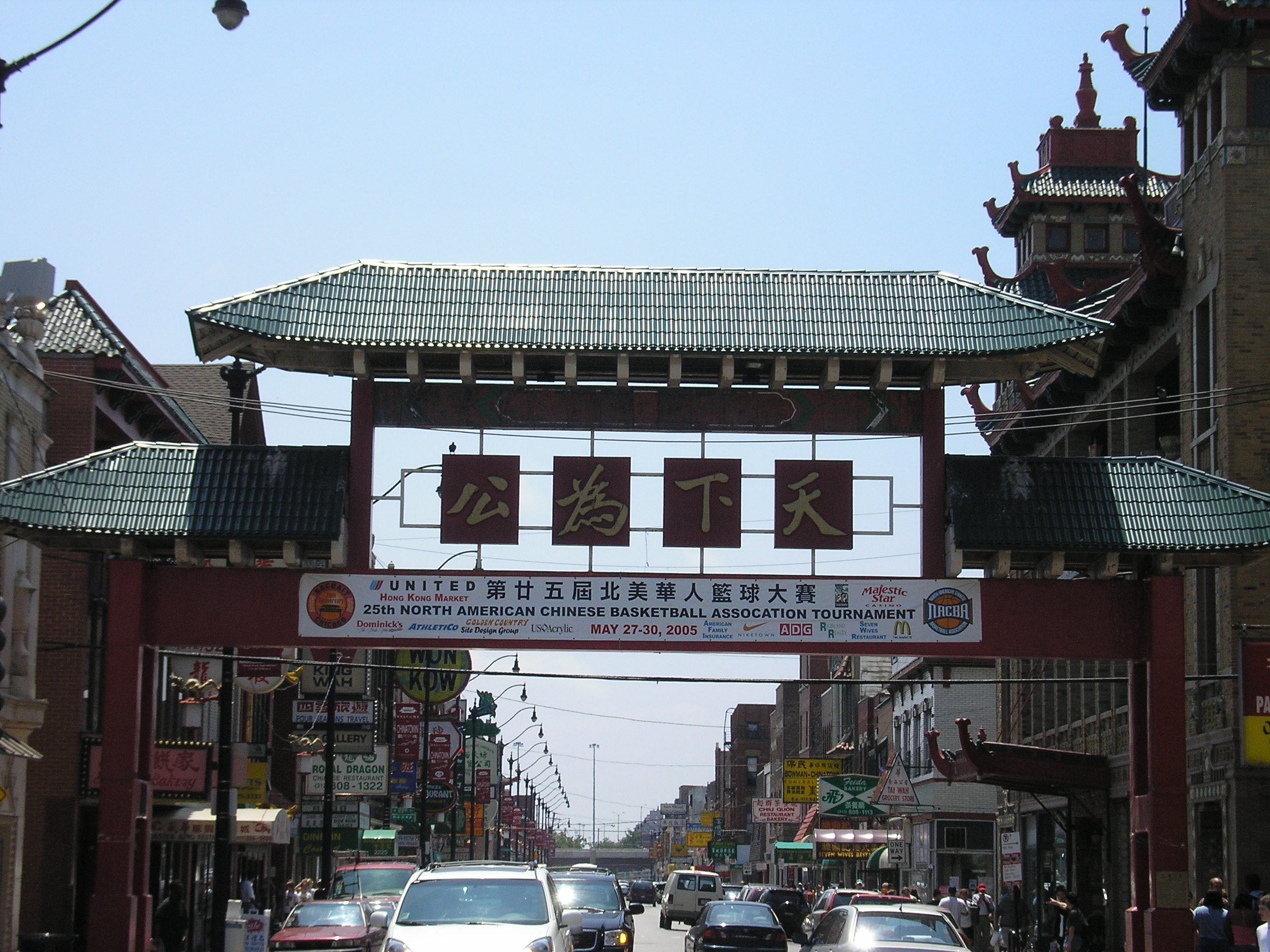
Chicago's Chinatown

The Chinatown in Chicago is a traditional urban ethnic enclave, occupying a large portion of the Armour Square region on the city's near south side. The intersection of Wentworth Avenue at Cermak Road is the neighborhood's historic epicenter. Chinatown has historically been dominated by Chinese-American commercial interests, though in recent years, large-scale construction of residential developments, particularly east of Canal Streets and the area adjacent to Ping Tom Park south of West 18th Street, have exponentially increased the number of residents in the area. While it is a cultural tourist attraction for visitors, Chinatown also attracts emigrants from China as a gateway neighborhood. The annual Chinese New Year and Chinese Double Ten Day Parade are both held in Chinatown.

=== Louisiana ===
==== New Orleans ====
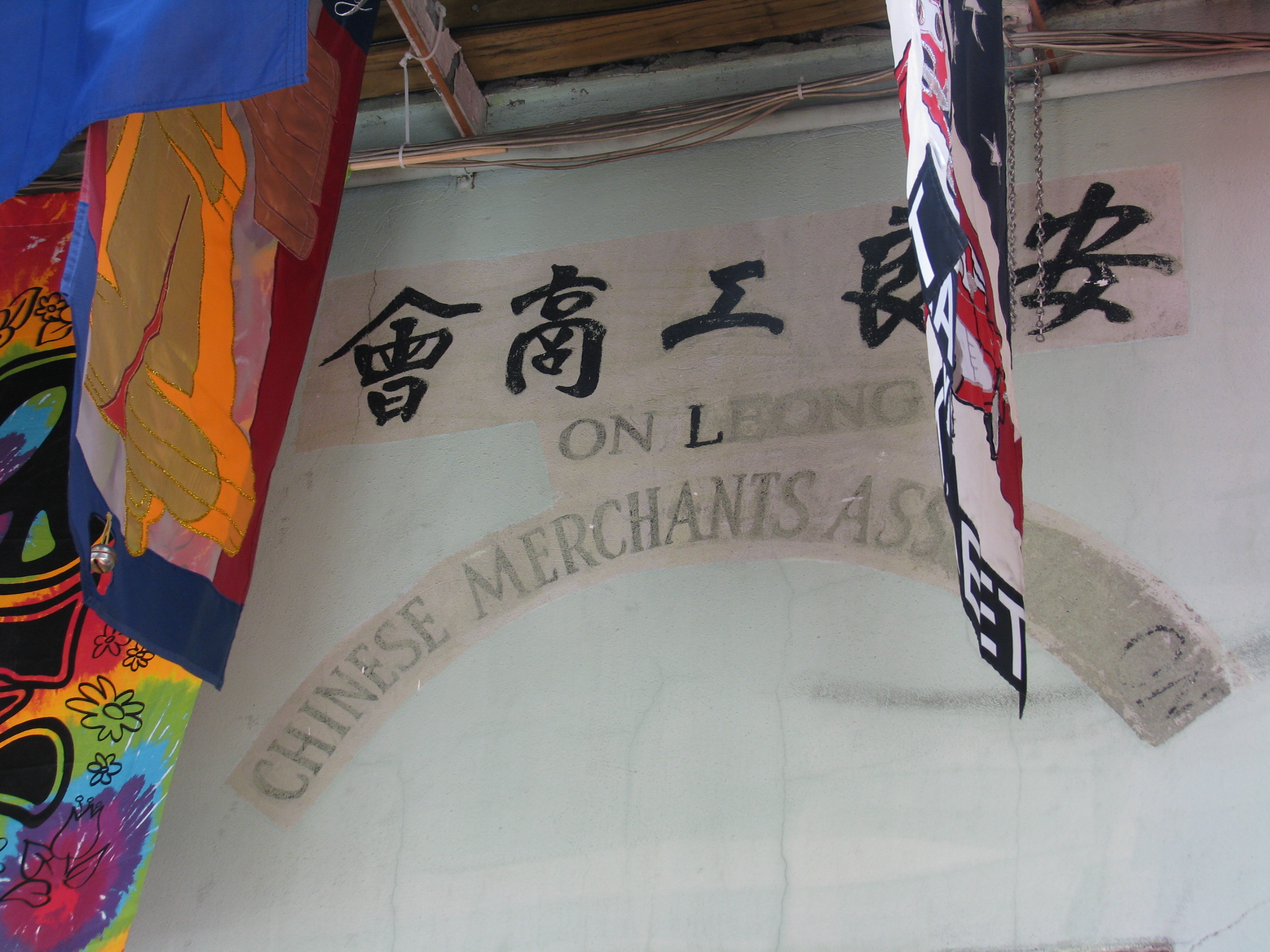
Former On Leong Merchant Association Building, 530 Bourbon Street, New Orleans, Louisiana

New Orleans was once home to one of the largest Chinatowns in the Southern United States. The first significant migration of Chinese to Louisiana took place during Reconstruction after the American Civil War, between 1867 and 1871, when local planters brought in hundreds of Cantonese contract laborers from Cuba, California, and directly from China as a low-cost replacement for slave labor. By the mid-1870s, nearly all of these laborers had abandoned the plantations and migrated to the cities of the South, especially New Orleans, in search of higher pay and better working conditions. They were followed by Chinese merchants from California and other states, who supplied the laborers, imported tea and other luxury goods to the Port of Orleans, and exported cotton and dried shrimp to China.

By the 1880s, these merchants had developed a small Chinatown on the 1100 block of Tulane Avenue, between Elk Place and South Rampart Street, near the modern Tulane stop on the North Rampart Streetcar line. Though much smaller than the Chinatowns of the West Coast or the industrial cities of the north, New Orleans Chinatown was the site of several dry goods groceries, import and export companies, apothecaries, restaurants, laundries, and the meeting halls of several Chinese associations. Chinatown continued to exist for six decades, until its destruction in a redevelopment project by the Works Progress Administration in 1937, during the Great Depression. Several office towers stand on the site of the former Tulane Avenue Chinatown. A few Chinese businesses attempted to build a second Chinatown on the 500-block of Bourbon Street, but this smaller Chinatown also died out over the next thirty years. Today, only the former meeting hall of the On Leong Merchants Association still remains on 530 Bourbon Street.

=== Maine ===
==== Portland ====
A Chinatown in Portland, Maine once existed around Monument Square and along Congress Street. The first Chinese person arrived in 1858, with the Chinatown forming around 1916 and lasting until around 1953. Portland's Chinatown existed modestly, with most Chinese being isolated due to discrimination and the Chinese Exclusion Act in 1882. By 1895, there were enough Chinese people that a Chinese community began to form, though mostly with men whose wives were prohibited from migration by the newly created law. The community celebrated their first Chinese New Year that year. By 1920, around 30 Chinese laundries existed in the city. In 1903, a union formed to fix prices for laundromats and consisted of around 100 people who owned the laundries. By around the 1950s, the Chinese community had shrunk to the point that Chinatown almost ceased to exist. By 1997, the last laundry was demolished, wiping out the last remaining vestige of Chinatown. Most Chinese men who lived in Chinatown attended a Chinese American church, with some going to China as missionaries.

=== Maryland ===
==== Baltimore ====
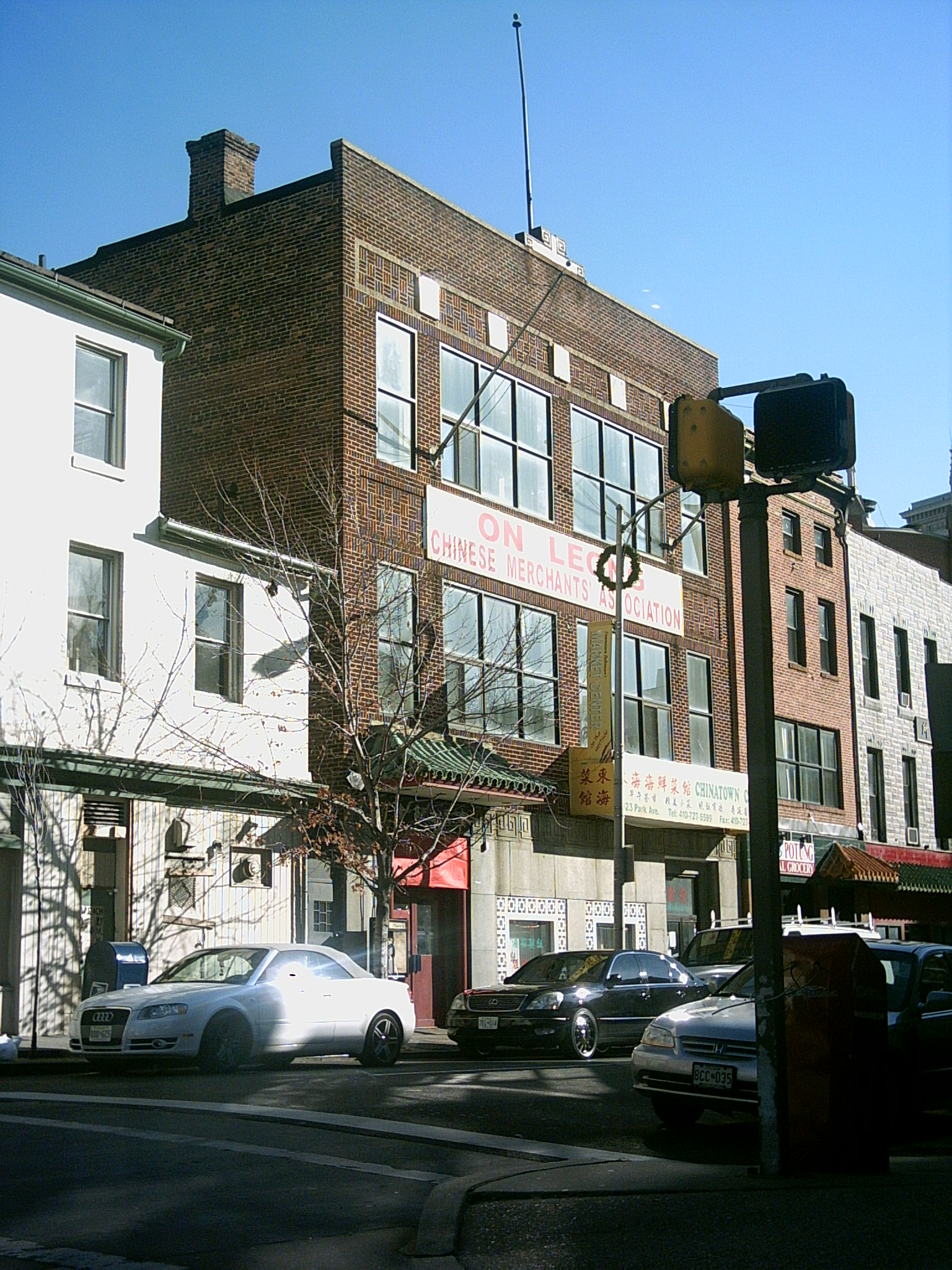
The On Leong Building in Baltimore's Chinatown

Baltimore, Maryland, has had two districts called "Chinatown", home to a few hundred people of Chinese descent. In the 1880s, an initial Chinese population attracted by the transcontinental railroad established a community on the 200 block of Marion Street. Later, a second Chinatown arose on the 300 block of Park Avenue, which was dominated by laundries and restaurants. The Chinese population never exceeded its peak of 400 in 1941. During segregation, Chinese children were classified as "white" and went to the white schools. Though Chinatown was mostly spared from the riots of the 1960s, most of the Chinese residents moved to the suburbs. As of 2009, the area still shows signs of blight and does not have a Chinese arch.

==== Rockville, Potomac, and North Potomac ====
Rockville, Potomac, and North Potomac are home to some of the largest Chinese communities in Maryland. At the 2000 census, 14.5% of North Potomac's residents were of Chinese ancestry, making it the area with the highest percentage of Chinese ancestry outside of California and Hawaii. North Potomac and Potomac, which are largely residential and consist of suburban subdivisions, have the highest concentration of Asian population in Maryland. Rockville, the county seat of Montgomery County, has become the center for Chinese and Taiwanese businesses along Rockville Pike and Wisconsin Avenue. Rockville is considered to be a "Little Taipei" due to the area's high concentration of Taiwanese immigrants.

Rockville's Chinatown runs along Rockville Pike from Helpine Road to East Jefferson Street, along E Jefferson Street and then along North Washington Street. It is considered a satellite of the Washington, D.C., Chinatown, and it grew in the aftermath of the riots of 1968, when many Chinese people moved to the suburbs of Maryland and Virginia. As of 2006, close to 30,000 people of Chinese descent lived in Montgomery County, most of whom were drawn to the good schools, and it was home to at least three Chinese newspapers. It is known for its authentic Chinese food.

The Chinese New Year parade is held in the Rockville Town Square.

=== Massachusetts ===
==== Boston ====
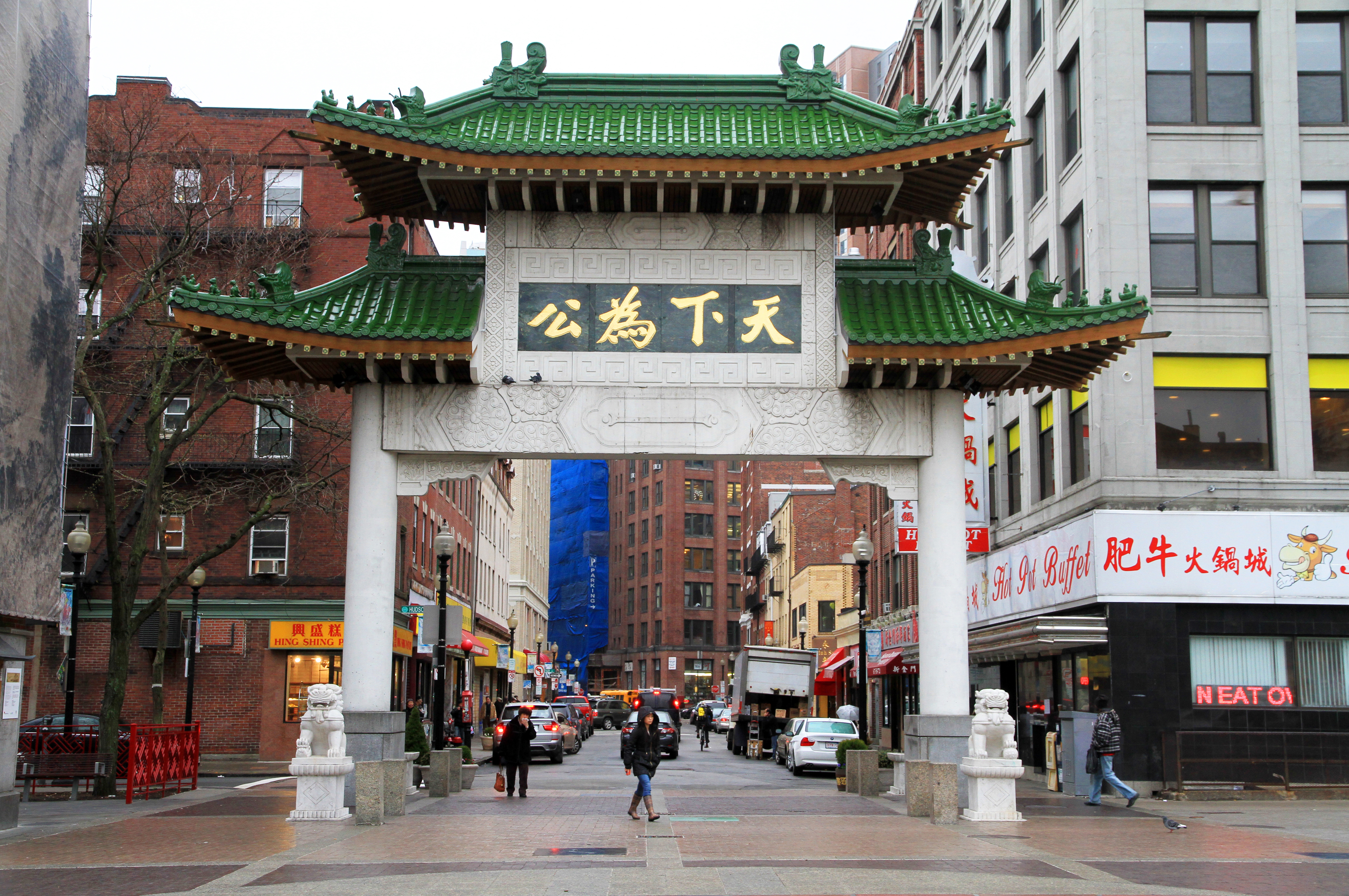
Paifang gate to Chinatown, Boston, one of the largest Chinatowns in the United States.

The sole established Chinatown of New England is in Boston, on Beach Street and Washington Street near South Station between Downtown Crossing and Tufts Medical Center. There are many Chinese, Japanese, Cambodian, and Vietnamese restaurants and markets in one of the largest Chinatowns in the United States.

In the pre-Chinatown era, the area was settled in succession by Irish, Jewish, Italian, and Syrian immigrants. Syrians were later succeeded by Chinese immigrants, and Chinatown was established in 1890. From the 1960s to the 1980s, Boston's Chinatown was located in the Combat Zone, which served as Boston's red light district. Currently, Boston's Chinatown is experiencing gentrification. High-rise luxury residential towers are built in the neighborhood, which was previously overwhelmingly three-, four-, and five-story small apartment buildings intermixed with retail and light-industrial spaces.

=== Michigan ===
==== Detroit ====
Detroit's Chinatown was originally located at Third Avenue, Porter Street and Bagley Street, now the permanent site of the MGM Grand Detroit casino. In the 1960s, urban renewal efforts, as well as the opportunity for the Chinese business community to purchase property, led to a relocation centered at Cass Avenue and Peterboro. However, Detroit's urban decline and escalating street violence, in particular the killing of restaurateur Tommie Lee, led to the new location's demise, with the last remaining Chinese food restaurant in Chinatown finally shutting its doors in the early 2000s. Although there is still a road marker indicating "Chinatown" and a mural commemorating the struggle for justice in the Vincent Chin case, only one Chinese American establishment still operates within the borders of Chinatown. The Association of Chinese Americans Detroit Outreach Center, a small community center, serves a handful of new Chinese immigrants who still reside in the Cass Corridor. Much of the Metro Detroit Chinese community live in the Troy area; other Asians such as Koreans also are in great number there. As of 2023, revitalization efforts have been under way for a revival of Detroit's Chinatown.

==== Houghton ====
Houghton's Chinatown formed during the Copper Rush of the 1890s & 1900s, many Chinese arrived either from China or a few from San Francisco. Most Chinese residents were residing within Houghton proper but a few settled in Calumet. All of the Chinese residents were single men, excluding Mr. Sing & Mr. Chin, whom married an American & German woman, respectively. By 1943, Sam Wah, proprietor, of Sam Wah Laundry, became the final Chinese resident of Houghton. Most Chinese residents had left for California or returned to China, but some died in Houghton. The growth of Michigan Tech revitalized and resurged the number of Asian-Americans in the area.

=== Missouri ===
==== St. Louis ====
A Chinatown existed in Downtown St. Louis from 1869 until its demolition for Busch Memorial Stadium in 1966. Also called Hop Alley, it was bounded by Seventh, Tenth, Walnut and Chestnut streets. The first Chinese immigrant to St. Louis was Alla Lee, born in Ningbo near Shanghai, who arrived in the city in 1857. Lee remained the only Chinese immigrant until 1869, when a group of about 250 immigrants (mostly men) arrived seeking factory work. In January 1870, another group of Chinese immigrants came to the city, including some women. By 1900, the immigrant population of St. Louis's Chinatown had settled at between 300 and 400. Chinatown established itself as the home to Chinese hand laundries, which in turn represented more than half of the city's laundry facilities. Other businesses included groceries, restaurants, tea shops, barber shops, and opium dens. Between 1958 and the mid-1960s, Chinatown was condemned and demolished for urban renewal and to make space for Busch Memorial Stadium.

=== Montana ===
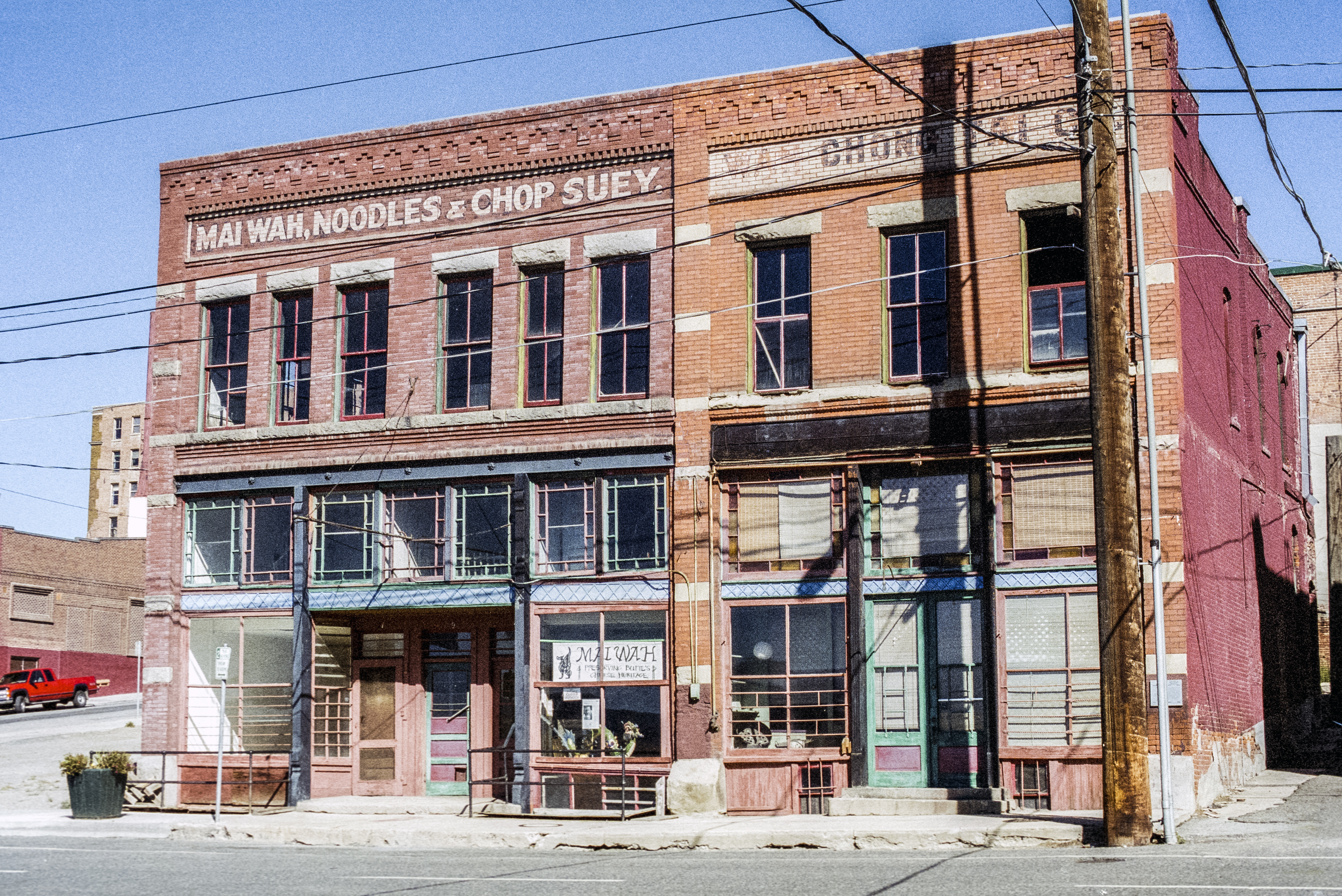
Mai Wah Society Building in Butte, Montana

The history of the Chinese in Montana closely ties with the building of the Northern Pacific Railroad in the 1860s in many cities and towns, including Butte, Big Timber, and other places. Today, one of the few reminders of Chinese society in Montana is the Chinese New Year parade that is held at the Mai Wah Museum in Butte.

==== Big Timber ====
A Chinatown existed in Big Timber from the 1880s until the 1930s, when the last Chinese residents left to go to larger Chinese settlements in California or back to China. It was located on the block bounded by Anderson, First, Mcleod, and Front streets.

==== Butte ====
Due to the mining boom in Butte, many Chinese workers moved in and set up businesses that led to the creation of a Chinatown in the late nineteenth century. There was anti-Chinese sentiment in the 1870s and onwards due to racism on the part of the white settlers, exacerbated by economic depression, and in 1895, the chamber of commerce and labor unions started a boycott of Chinese owned businesses. The business owners fought back by suing the unions and winning. The decline of Butte's Chinatown started in 1895 and continued until only 92 Chinese people remained by 1940 in the entire city. After that, the influence the Chinese had on the area was largely gone as they moved out one by one. The history of the Chinese in Butte and throughout the mountain states is documented in the Mai Wah Museum.

==== Cedar Creek ====
Cedar Creek (Superior, MT) was home to a Chinese population, according to artifacts unearthed in a 2007 excavation.

==== Helena ====
Helena, Montana was at one time home to a Chinatown at Reeder's Alley. It had completely vanished by the 1970s. Due to some efforts to preserve the historical aspects of the buildings, the area was spared from complete demolition, and is fixed up as part of the museum. According to the 1880 US Census, Helena's Chinatown had a Chinese population of 1,765, of which 359 of them were living in the metropolitan area. At that time, this Chinatown was the largest in the state of Montana.

=== Nebraska ===
==== Omaha ====
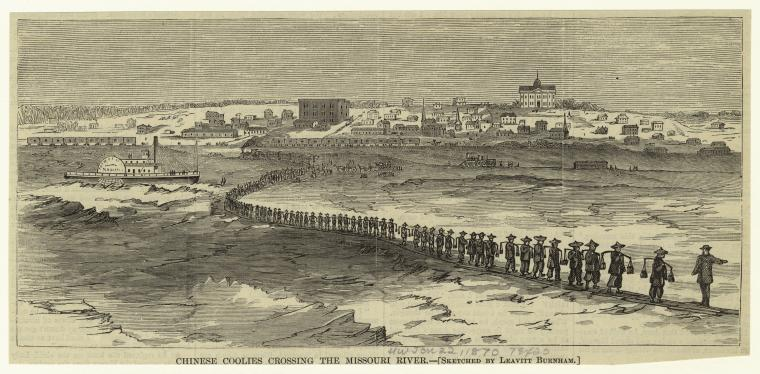
A sketch entitled "Chinese Coolies Crossing the Missouri River," by journalist, artist and later attorney Leavitt Burnham. These scene shows Omaha in the 1880s in the background.

The Chinese community in Omaha was originally established in the 1860s by the Union Pacific Railroad and other western industrial concerns as the railroad swept west starting in Omaha. In 1870, Harper's Weekly claimed 250 Chinese laborers passed through Omaha to build a railroad in Texas. The city's first noted burial of a Chinese person occurred at Prospect Hill Cemetery in July 1874, and an Omaha newspaper noted the local Chinese population was 12 men and one woman. In 1890, Omaha had 91 Chinese residents, and the city directory listed at least 21 Chinese-owned laundries in 1895. After the Omaha World-Herald reported that 438 men, women, and children were brought to Omaha from China to help with the Chinese village at the Trans-Mississippi and International Exposition in Omaha, the US Census found 93 Chinese people lived in Omaha in 1900. In 1916, the newspaper reported 150 Chinese residents in Omaha, when the local On Leong Tong opened.

=== Nevada ===
==== Carson City, Reno, and Virginia City ====
The city of Carson City, Nevada was once home to a Chinese community of 789 residents. The Chinatown was located near the State Capitol buildings on Third Street between 1855 until 1908, when Chinatown burned to the ground. In 1880, one in five people living in Carson City was Chinese, but by 1950 the Chinese population was close to zero. Other cities in Nevada, such as Virginia City and Reno, also had well-established Chinatowns. Reno's Chinatown was burned down in 1878 by the Reno Workingmans Party.

==== Las Vegas ====
Las Vegas is currently home to the largest Asian population in the state of Nevada. Chinatown begins at Spring Mountain Road and Procyon Street and extends west for two miles to Rainbow Boulevard. There is also a growing presence of Asian restaurants and markets along South Rainbow Boulevard.

==== Winnemucca ====
The city of Winnemucca, Nevada was centered around the Joss House on Baud Street. The Joss House was demolished on March 8, 1955, by order of the Winnemucca City Council.

=== New Jersey ===
==== Belleville ====
Belleville was the location of the first Chinatown on the East Coast of the United States.

==== Bradley Beach ====
Bradley Beach is notable for the location where many Chinese from Manhattan's New York City would go to see the ocean .

==== Newark ====
Newark's Chinatown was a neighborhood centered along Market Street founded around 1875 and remaining on some scale for nearly 100 years. The center of the neighborhood was directly east of the Government Center neighborhood. The first Chinese businesses appeared in Newark in the second half of the 19th century and in the early part of the 20th century. By the 1920s, the small area had a Chinese population of over 3,000.

In 1910, a small lane with housing and shopping was built called Mulberry Arcade, connecting Mulberry Street and Columbia Street between Lafayette and Green Streets. In the 1920s, recurring federal opium raids disrupted the community, causing many to move to more peaceful places. Despite an attempt to revive the neighborhood decades later, the Mulberry Arcade (the center of Chinatown) was removed in the 1950s.

==== Princeton ====
Princeton, New Jersey, home to Princeton University, is roughly 15–25% Asian, with many Asian and Chinese restaurants and businesses around the area.

=== New York ===
==== New York City ====
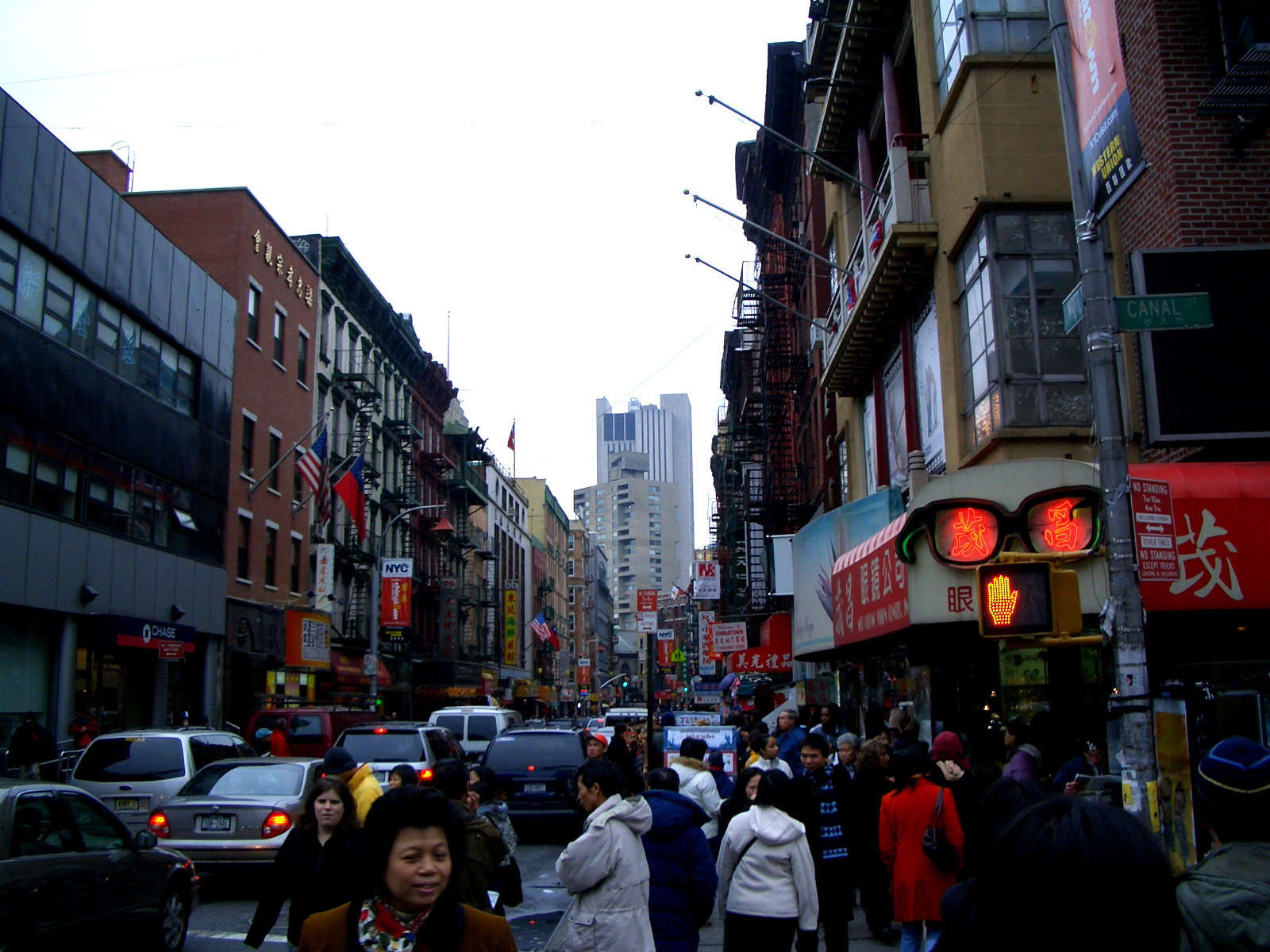
An intersection in Manhattan Chinatown

The New York metropolitan area contains the largest ethnic Chinese population outside of Asia, comprising an estimated 893,697 uniracial individuals as of 2017, including at least 9 Chinatowns – six (or nine, including the emerging Chinatowns in Corona and Whitestone, Queens, and East Harlem, Manhattan) in New York City proper, and one each in Nassau County, Long Island; Edison, New Jersey; and Parsippany-Troy Hills, New Jersey, not to mention fledgling ethnic Chinese enclaves emerging throughout the New York City metropolitan area.

The first Chinese immigrants came to Lower Manhattan around 1870, looking for the "golden" opportunities America had to offer. By 1880, the enclave around Five Points was estimated to have from 200 to as many as 1,100 members. However, the Chinese Exclusion Act, which went into effect in 1882, caused an abrupt decline in the number of Chinese who immigrated to New York and the rest of the United States. Later, in 1943, the Chinese were given a small quota, and the community's population gradually increased until 1968, when the quota was lifted and the Chinese American population skyrocketed. In the past few years, the Cantonese dialect that has dominated Chinatown for decades has been rapidly swept aside by Mandarin Chinese, the national language of China and the lingua franca of most of the latest Chinese immigrants.

===== Manhattan =====
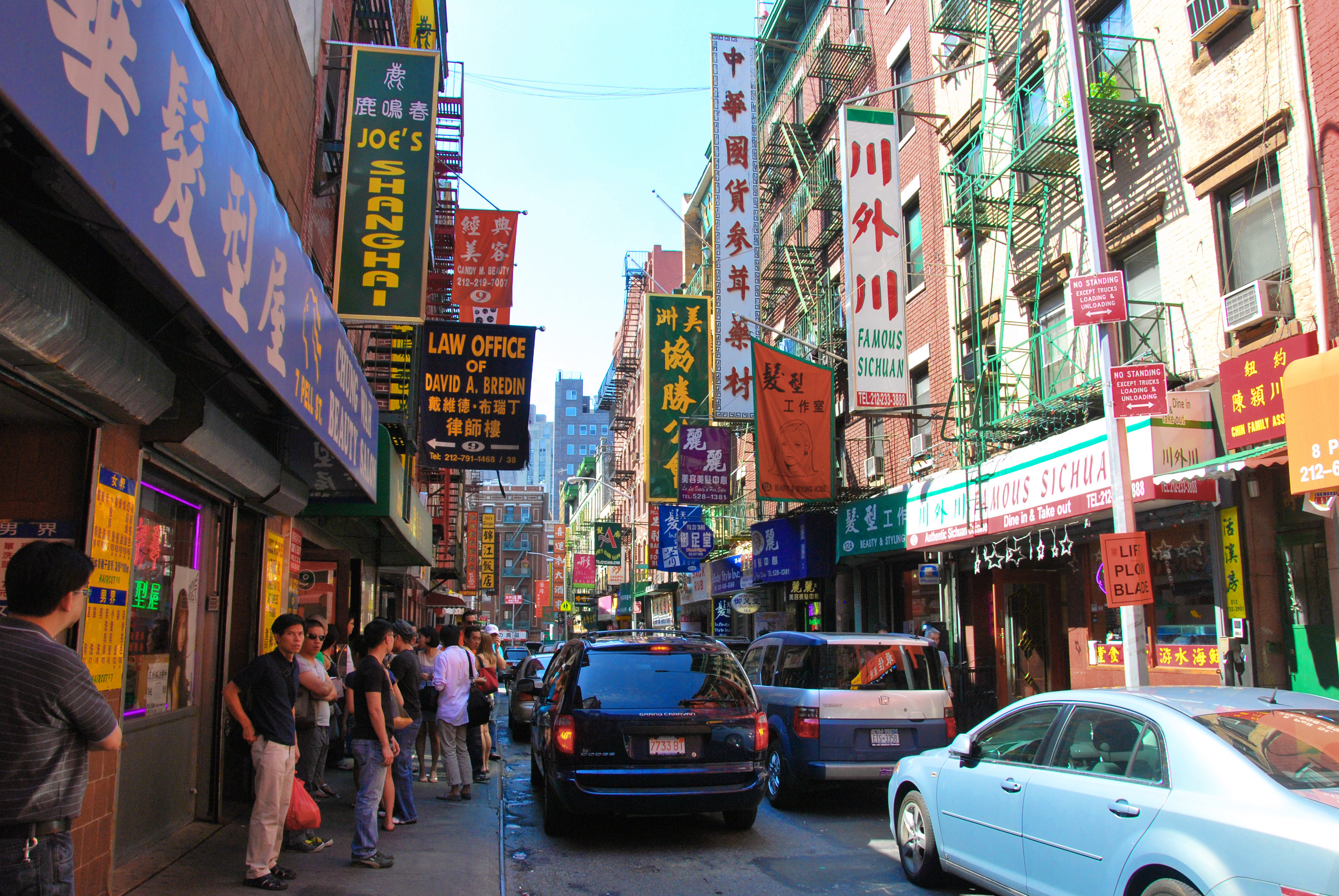
Manhattan Chinatown

The Manhattan Chinatown (simplified Chinese: 纽约华埠; traditional Chinese: 紐約華埠; pinyin: Niŭyuē Huá Bù), home to the largest enclave of Chinese people in the Western Hemisphere, is located in the borough of Manhattan in New York City. Within Manhattan's expanding Chinatown lies a Little Fuzhou on East Broadway and surrounding streets, occupied predominantly by immigrants from the Fujian Province of mainland China. Areas surrounding the "Little Fuzhou" consist mostly of Cantonese immigrants from Guangdong Province, the earlier Chinese settlers, and in some areas moderately of Cantonese immigrants.

In the past few years, however, the Cantonese dialect that has dominated Chinatown for decades is being rapidly swept aside by Mandarin, the national language of China and the lingua franca of most of the latest Chinese immigrants. The energy and population of Manhattan's Chinatown are fueled by relentless, massive immigration from mainland China, both legal and illegal in origin, propagated in large part by New York's high density, extensive mass transit system, and huge economic marketplace.

The early settlers of Manhattan's Chinatown were mostly Cantonese speakers from Taishan and Hong Kong of the Guangdong province of China, and also from Shanghai. They formed most of the Chinese population of the area surrounded by Mott and Canal Streets. The later settlers, from Fuzhou, Fujian, form the Chinese population of the area bounded by East Broadway. Chinatown's modern borders are roughly Grand Street on the north, Broadway on the west, Chrystie Street on the east, and East Broadway to the south.

After 9/11, approximately 23% of these residents relocated to the surrounding communities of the Mohegan Sun casinos, mainly in Norwich, Connecticut, creating a new Chinatown there.

===== Queens =====
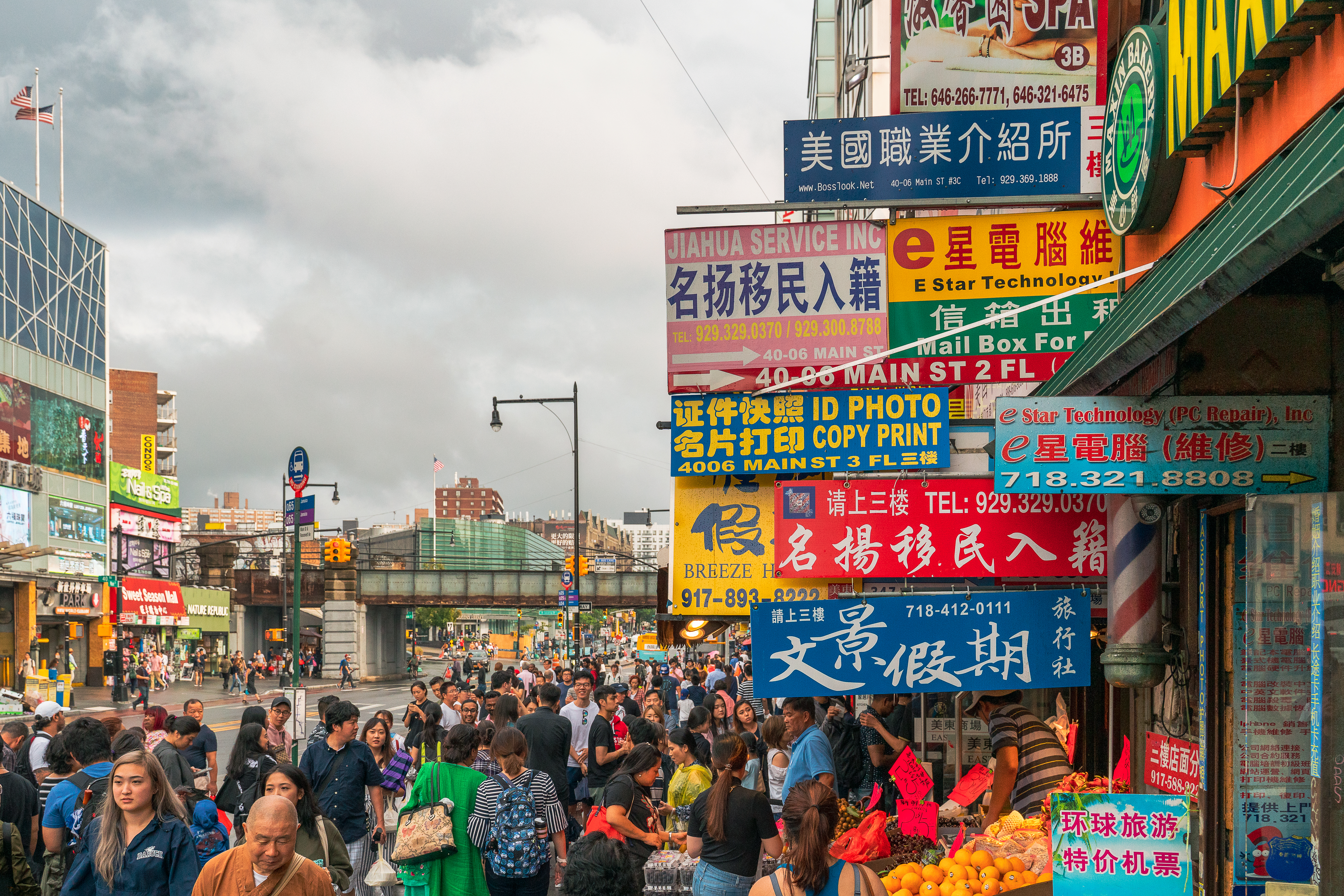
The Flushing Chinatown (法拉盛華埠)

The Flushing Chinatown, in the Flushing area of the borough of Queens in New York City, is one of the largest and fastest growing ethnic Chinese enclaves outside of Asia, as well as within New York City itself. Main Street and the area to its west, particularly along Roosevelt Avenue, have become the primary nexus of Flushing Chinatown, and one of the busiest pedestrian intersections in the world. However, Chinatown continues to expand southeastward along Kissena Boulevard and northward beyond Northern Boulevard. In the 1970s, a Chinese community established a foothold in the neighborhood of Flushing, whose demographic constituency had been predominantly non-Hispanic white and Japanese. Taiwanese people began the surge of immigration, followed by other groups of Chinese. By 1990, Asians constituted 41% of the population of the core area of Flushing, with Chinese in turn representing 41% of the Asian population. The Flushing Chinatown has also become the epicenter of organized prostitution in the United States. Flushing is undergoing rapid gentrification by Chinese transnational entities. As of 2023, illegal Chinese immigration to New York City, and especially to Queens and its Flushing Chinatown, has accelerated.

Ethnic Chinese constitute an increasingly dominant proportion of the Asian population as well as of the overall population in Flushing and its Chinatown. Mandarin Chinese (including Northeastern Mandarin), Fuzhou dialect, Min Nan Fujianese, Wu Chinese, Beijing dialect, Wenzhounese, Shanghainese, Cantonese, Taiwanese, and English are all prevalent in Flushing Chinatown. The popular styles of Chinese cuisine are ubiquitously accessible in Flushing, including Hakka, Taiwanese, Shanghainese, Hunanese, Sichuanese, Cantonese, Fujianese, Xinjiang, Zhejiang, and Korean Chinese cuisine. Even the relatively obscure Dongbei style of cuisine indigenous to Northeast China is now available in Flushing, as well as Mongolian cuisine and Uyghur cuisine. The growth of the business activity at the core of Downtown Flushing, dominated by the Flushing Chinatown, has continued despite the COVID-19 pandemic.

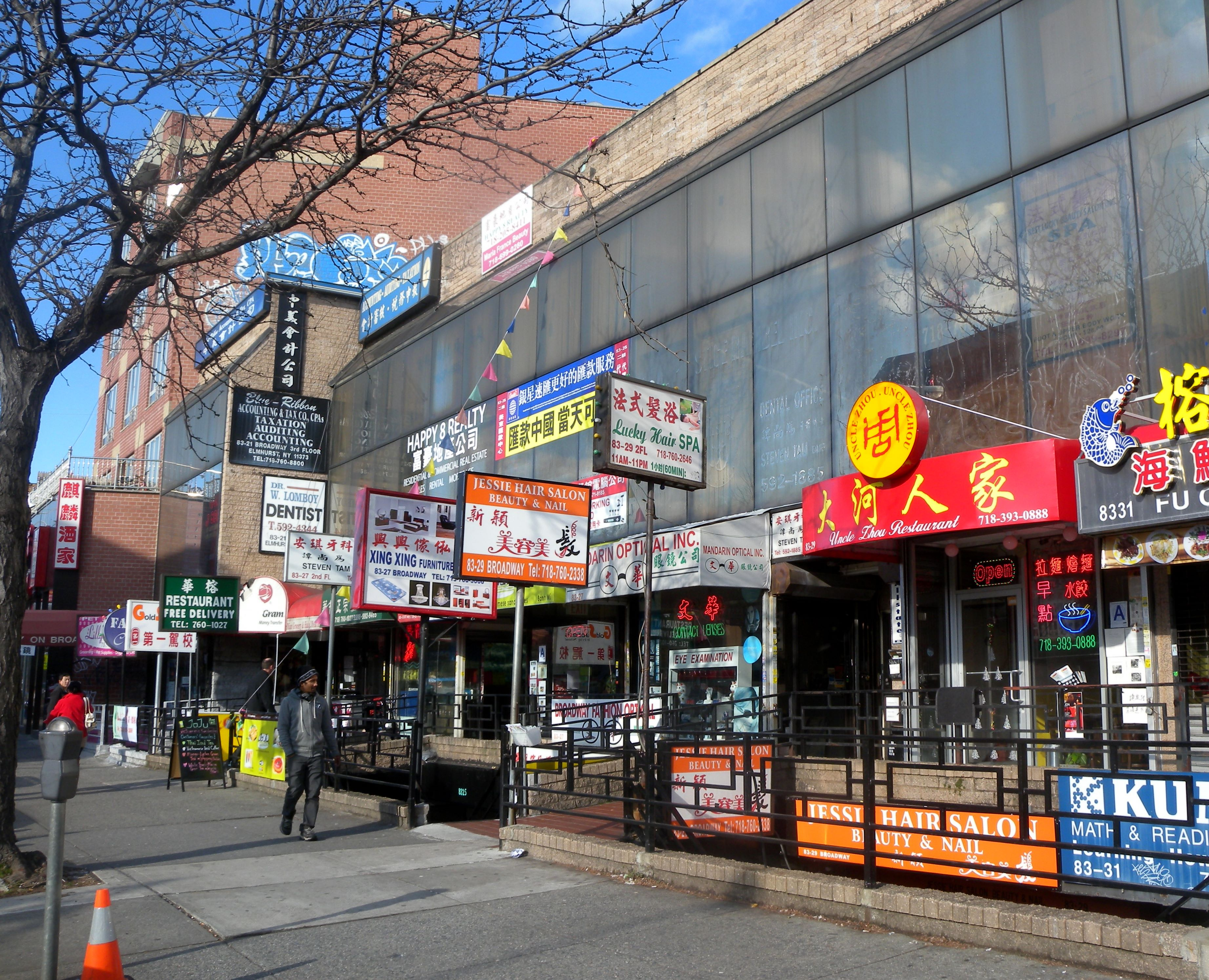
The Elmhurst Chinatown (唐人街, 艾姆赫斯特) on Broadway, near Queens Blvd.

Elmhurst, another neighborhood in the borough of Queens, also has a large and growing Chinese community. Previously a small area with Chinese shops on Broadway between 81st Street and Cornish Avenue, this newly evolved second Chinatown in Queens has now expanded to 45th Avenue and Whitney Avenue. Newer Chinatowns are also emerging in Corona and Whitestone, Queens.

===== Brooklyn =====
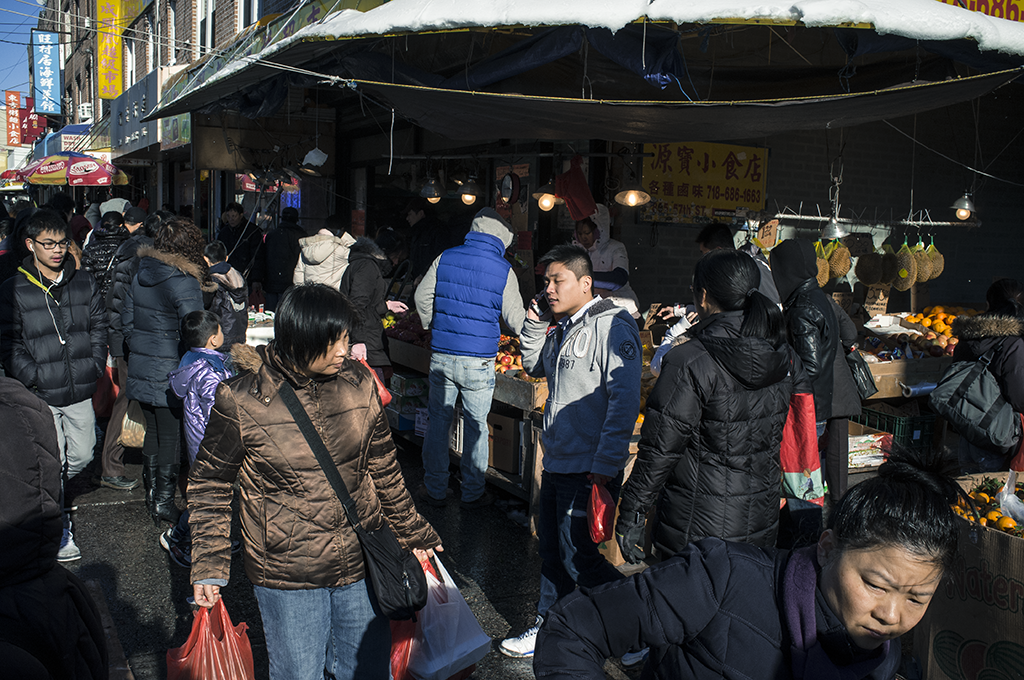
One of several Chinatowns in Brooklyn (布魯克林華埠)

By 1988, 90% of the storefronts on Eighth Avenue in the Sunset Park, in southern Brooklyn, had been abandoned. Chinese immigrants then moved into this area, not only new arrivals from China, but also members of Manhattan's Chinatown seeking refuge from high rents, who fled to the cheap property costs and rents of Sunset Park and formed what has been called "the Brooklyn Chinatown", which now extends for 20 blocks along Eighth Avenue, from 42nd to 62nd Streets. This relatively new but rapidly growing Chinatown located in Sunset Park, Brooklyn was originally settled by Cantonese immigrants like Manhattan's Chinatown in the past.

However, in the recent decade, an influx of Fuzhou immigrants has been pouring into Brooklyn's Chinatown and supplanting the Cantonese at a significantly higher rate than in Manhattan's Chinatown, and Brooklyn Chinatown is now home to mostly Fuzhou immigrants. In the past, during the 1980s and 1990s, the majority of newly arriving Fuzhou immigrants were settling within Manhattan's Chinatown, and the first Little Fuzhou community emerged in New York City within Manhattan's Chinatown; by the 2000s, however, the epicenter of the massive Fuzhou influx had shifted to Brooklyn Chinatown, which is now home to the fastest growing and perhaps largest Fuzhou population in New York City. Unlike the Little Fuzhou in the Manhattan Chinatown, which remains surrounded by areas which continue to house significant populations of Cantonese, all of Brooklyn's Chinatown is swiftly consolidating into New York City's new Little Fuzhou. However, a growing community of Wenzhounese immigrants from China's Zhejiang Province is now also arriving in Brooklyn's Chinatown.

Also in contrast to Manhattan's Chinatown, which still retains the large Cantonese community established decades ago, Brooklyn's Chinatown is very quickly losing its Cantonese community identity. Within Brooklyn, newer satellite Chinatowns are emerging around Avenue U and Bensonhurst, as well as in Bay Ridge, Borough Park, Coney Island, Dyker Heights, Gravesend, and Marine Park. While the foreign-born Chinese population in New York City jumped 35 percent between 2000 and 2013, to 353,000 from about 262,000, the foreign-born Chinese population in Brooklyn increased 49 percent during the same period, to 128,000 from 86,000, according to The New York Times.

===== Staten Island =====
New Dorp is home to a "...burgeoning Chinese community." The area also includes Midland Beach to the north.

=== Ohio ===
==== Cleveland ====
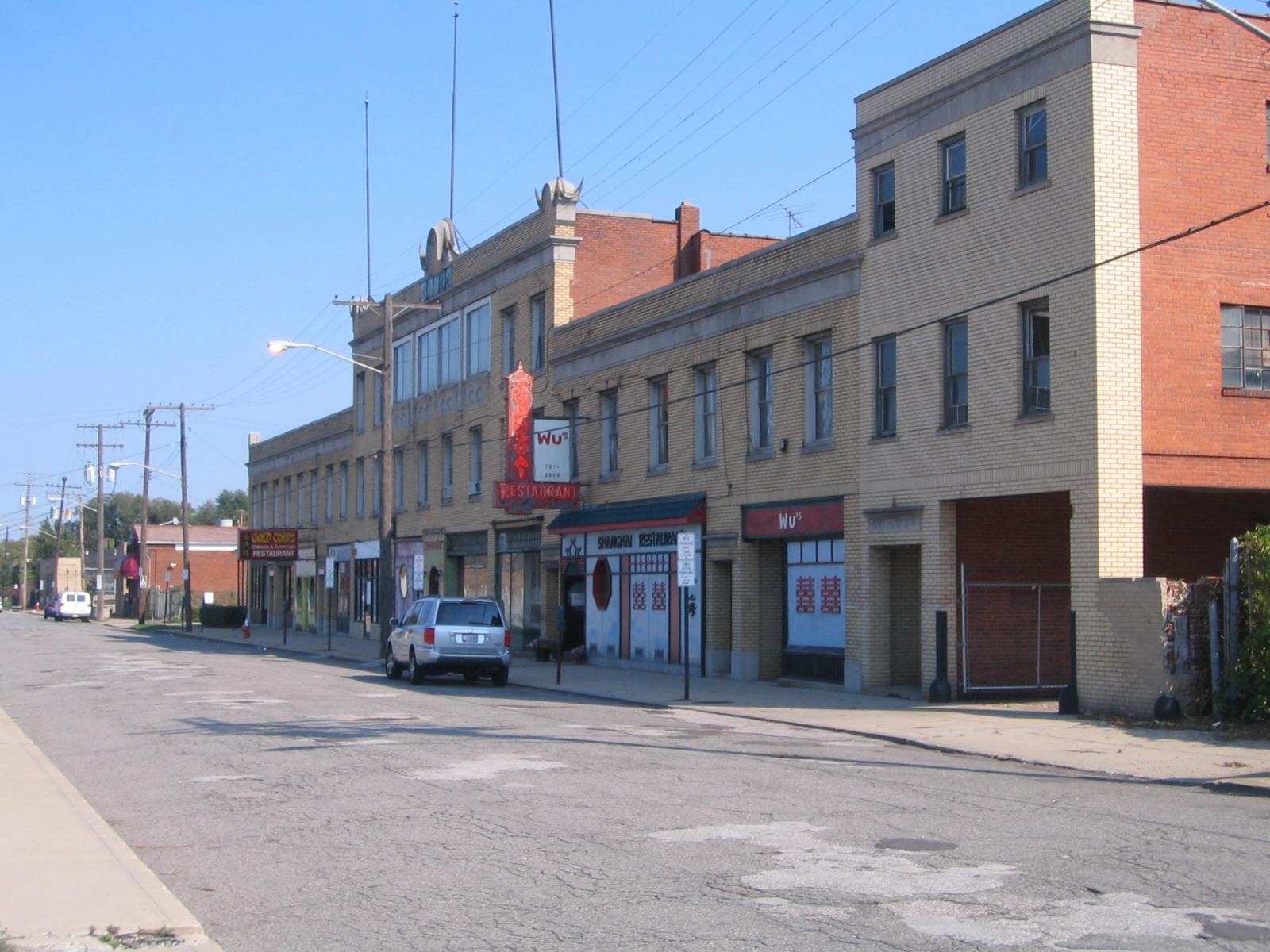
Chinatown, "Asiatown" as found in an enclave of downtown Cleveland, Ohio.

The Chinatown in Cleveland is an ethnic neighborhood established in the late nineteenth century. A majority of Chinese Ohioans lived in northeastern Ohio, where they worked in factories or established their own businesses to provide their fellow Chinese Americans with traditional Chinese products. For most of the second half of the nineteenth century, Cleveland, which had the largest Chinese-American population in Ohio, had fewer than one hundred Chinese residents. They settled along Ontario Street, where they established Chinatown. For most of its history, Cleveland's Chinatown consisted of only one city block and contained several Chinese restaurants, laundries, and specialty stores. Initially, most Chinese in Cleveland lived in Chinatown to surround themselves with people of similar cultural beliefs and also to escape the animosity of Cleveland's other residents. By World War II, the city's Chinese population had increased to almost nine hundred. With the communist takeover of China in the late 1940s, an increase in Chinese immigration occurred to the United States, including to Ohio. Most of these new migrants came from Hong Kong or Taiwan.Over time, especially by the 1960s, many Chinese Clevelanders began to move into new neighborhoods, as Cleveland's other residents became more tolerant of the Chinese.

=== Oklahoma ===
==== Oklahoma City ====
Oklahoma City once had a historic Chinatown in its downtown area, located at the current location of the Cox Convention Center.

Oklahoma City now has an Asia District, comprising Chinese, Filipinos, Vietnamese, and other groups.

=== Oregon ===
==== Portland ====
Old Town Chinatown is the official Chinatown of the Northwest section of Portland, Oregon. The Willamette River forms its eastern boundary, separating it from the Lloyd District and the Kerns and Buckman neighborhoods. It includes the Portland Skidmore/Old Town Historic District and the Portland New Chinatown/Japantown Historic District, which are listed on the National Register of Historic Places.

In the Northwest section, NW Broadway forms the western boundary, separating the neighborhood from the Pearl District, and West Burnside Street forms the southern boundary, separating it from Downtown Portland. In the Southwest section, the neighborhood extends from SW 3rd Avenue east to the Willamette River and from SW Stark Street north to West Burnside Street, with the exception of areas south of SW Pine Street and west of SW 2nd Avenue, and south of SW Oak Street and west of SW 1st Avenue, which are parts of Downtown.

==== Salem ====
Downtown Salem had a Chinatown during the mid-to-late-1800s, which vanished in the 1920s. Ships from Hong Kong started arriving in Portland in 1868, and some Chinese immigrants settled in Salem in the next two decades. Salem's Chinatown spanned Commercial, Ferry and Trade streets, and had markets, laundromats, and medicine shops. The local Chinese population reached a peak of 367 in 1890, although it decreased to 72 residents in 1920.

=== Pennsylvania ===
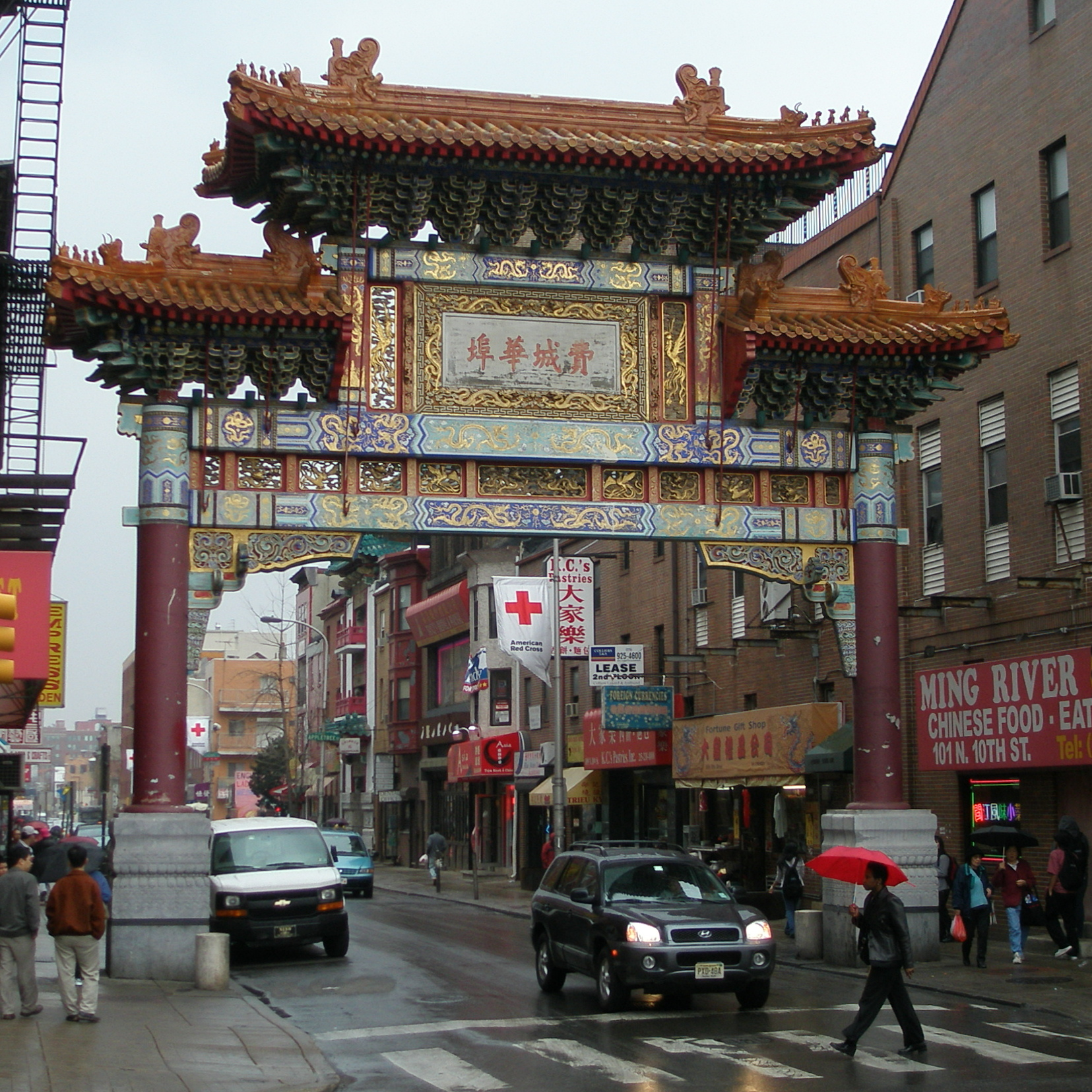
Paifang gate in Chinatown, Philadelphia

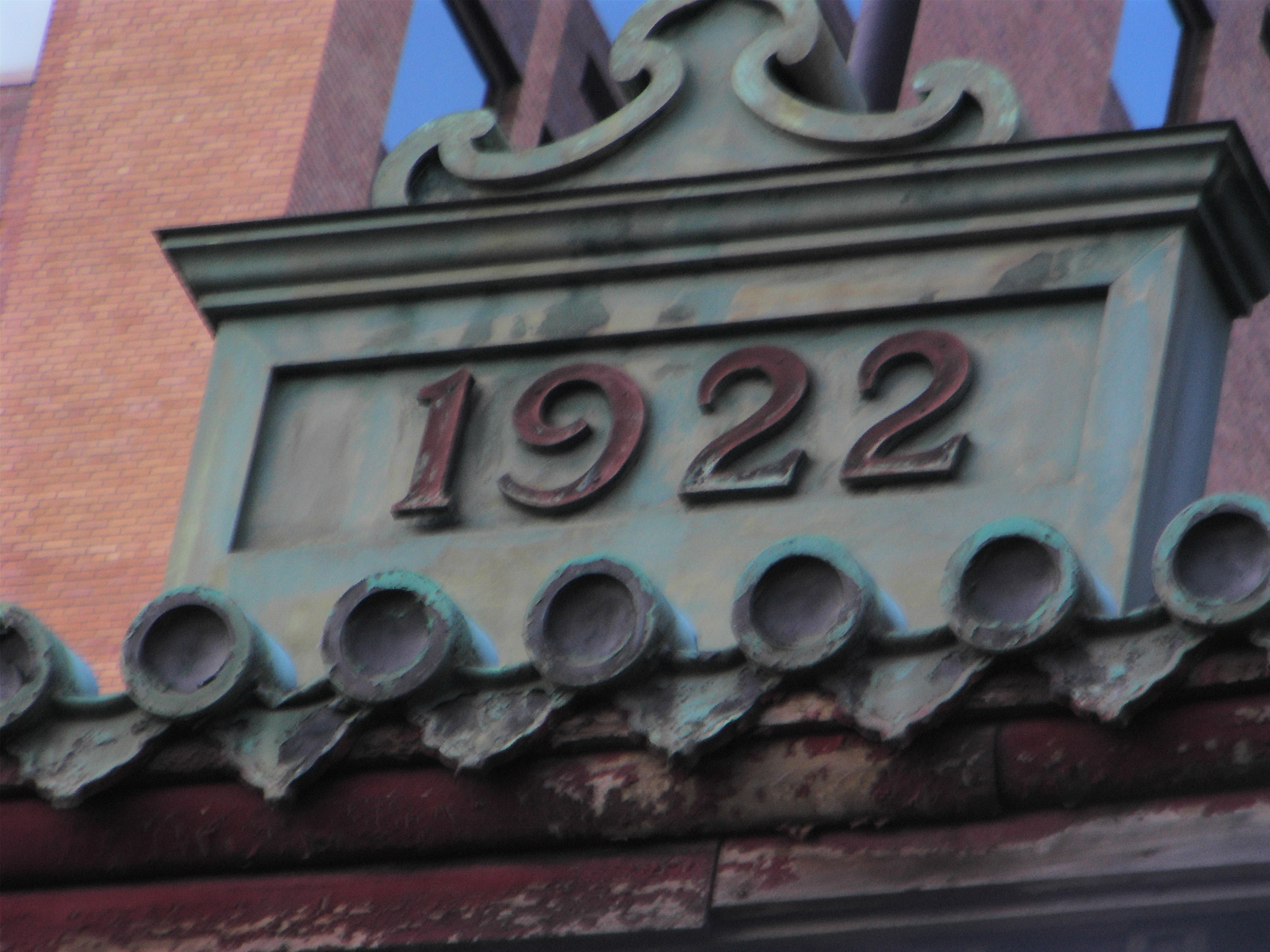
Built in 1922, Pittsburgh

==== Beaver Falls ====
In the early 1870s, Beaver Falls had a brief presence of Chinese people.

==== Philadelphia ====
There is a Chinatown centered on 10th and Race Streets in Philadelphia. Over the years, several blocks were lost to the Pennsylvania Convention Center, and the Vine Street Expressway. For the past few years, city officials have restricted redevelopment in Chinatown, particularly as a result of efforts by a coalition of grassroots groups (pan-ethnic, labor groups) working together to preserve Chinatown. Today the lost blocks have been regained by the expansion of Chinatown to Arch Street and north of Vine Street. Asian restaurants, funeral homes, and grocery stores are common sights. Philadelphia's Chinatown residents are mostly of Chinese, Vietnamese, Thai, and Cambodian descent. Korean, Japanese, and Filipinos are also residents. Chinatown contains a mixture of businesses and organizations owned by the pan-Chinese diaspora, as mainland Chinese, Vietnamese Chinese, Hong Kong Chinese, and Malaysian Chinese residing in the Philadelphia area call Chinatown home.

==== Pittsburgh ====
Pittsburgh, Pennsylvania was home to a "small, but busy" Chinatown, located at the intersection of Grant Street and Boulevard of the Allies, where only two Chinese restaurants remain. The On Leong Society was located there. By the 1950s, the Chinese community had exited the neighborhood, leaving this Chinatown extinct today.

Pittsburgh, with Carnegie Mellon University, has an Asian community and has remnants of the historic Chinatown exist on a strip with several restaurants and a Chinese pagoda-styled arch.

=== Rhode Island ===
==== Providence ====
Providence, Rhode Island was once home to at least two Chinatowns, with the first on Burrill Street in the 1890s until 1901 and then around Empire Street in the late 1890s in the southern section of the city. According to another source, the Burrill Street Chinatown was burned to the ground in 1901 by a "mysterious fire" caused by a kerosene stove.

The Empire Street Chinatown was considered one of the "last of the old Chinatowns" in a grouping that included Boston, Philadelphia and Baltimore. The extension of Empire Street, proposed in 1914 (according to the Providence Sunday Journal) and completed around 1951 doomed the Chinatown, and all of the buildings were demolished, including the former headquarters of local Chinese societies. The enclave was once located next to the Empire Theatre and the Central Baptist Church.

Brown University in Providence is home to many Chinese and Chinese-American students. 6% of students are Chinese international students and the student body is overall 19% Asian American, which may or may not include Chinese foreign students and residents.

=== South Dakota ===
==== Deadwood ====
A Chinatown once existed in Deadwood, South Dakota around the mid-1880s. The Chinese community consisted mainly of gold mine workers who were often classified as "rugged". Following the collapse of the silver mining industry during the Panic of 1893, many of the Chinese workers, who were primarily male and did not establish families, left the area in search of better opportunity, dissolving the ethnic enclave.

=== Texas ===
==== Houston ====
The U.S. city of Houston has two locations that have been recognized as Chinatowns. The older neighborhood is in East Downtown Houston and the newer community is located in Southwest Houston.

The first businesses of the East Downtown Chinatown were opened by Cantonese Chinese immigrants in the 1930s. It continued to grow in subsequent decades until many of its businesses relocated to Houston's new Chinatown. There have been attempts by business leaders to reverse the decline of Chinatown in East Downtown, but many new residents have sought to rebrand the area to reflect the current cultural shift.

The new Houston Chinatown in Southwest Houston can trace its beginnings to several businesses that opened in 1983. The new Chinatown began to expand in the 1990s when many Houston-area Asian American entrepreneurs moved their businesses from older neighborhoods in a search for less expensive properties and lower crime rates. Houston's new Chinatown is about 12 miles (19 km) southwest of Downtown Houston. It is over 6 square miles (16 km^{2}), making it among the largest automobile-centric Chinatowns in the United States. Some local officials have tried to change the name of the new Chinatown to "Asia Town" due to many different ethnic groups having a presence there.

==== Richardson and Plano ====
The D-FW China Town shopping center is located in Richardson because of the large Asian population. Chinese immigration began in Richardson in 1975. Since then the Chinese community has expanded to the north. In the mid-1980s the majority of ethnic Chinese K-12 students in the DFW area resided in Richardson.

As of 2012, North Texas has over 60 Chinese cultural organizations, most them headquartered in Richardson and Plano. The Dallas Chinese Community Center (DCCC; Chinese: 达拉斯华人活动中心; pinyin: Dálāsī Huárén Huódòngzhōngxīn) is in the D-FW Chinatown. As of 2011 the Chinese restaurants catering to ethnic Chinese in DFW are mainly in Richardson and Plano.

=== Utah ===
==== Salt Lake City ====
Historically, Salt Lake City, Utah had a Chinatown beginning in the 1860s that was located in a section called "Plum Alley" on Second South Street. The Chinese residents predominantly worked in the mining camps and on the transcontinental railroad. The enclave lasted until 1952. The area had a network of laundromats, restaurants and oriental specialty shops. There is a newer Chinatown-themed plaza in South Salt Lake.

=== Washington ===
==== Seattle ====
Seattle's current Chinese neighborhood came into being around 1910 when much of the former Chinatown along Washington Street was condemned for street construction. The Chinese population began rebuilding along King Street, south of Seattle's Nihonmachi. Chinese investors pooled their resources to build several substantial buildings to house businesses, organizations and residences, such as the East Kong Yick Building.

In the 1950s Seattle officials designated Chinatown as part of the International District (ID) due to the diverse Asian population that, by then, included Chinese, Japanese, Filipinos, and Koreans. By the late 1970s, Vietnamese immigrants also formed a Little Saigon next to Chinatown, within the ID.

There has been some controversy over the name "International District". Some local Chinese Americans reject the term, preferring the historic designation "Chinatown" for the area as a source of pride. Others, especially American born generations of Asians, accept the ID designation as more appropriate due to their embrace of a more "pan-Asian" identity. Subsequently, the city redesignated the area the Chinatown-International District.

==== Spokane ====
A fair-sized Chinatown developed in Spokane after the railroad came through in 1883. It consisted of a network of alleys between Front Avenue (today's Spokane Falls Boulevard) and Main Avenue that stretched east from Howard Avenue to Bernard Street about four blocks. The Chinese population gradually thinned out, although the area saw an influx of Japanese Americans fleeing incarceration during World War II. All the remains of Chinatown were demolished for parking for Spokane's Expo '74.

==== Tacoma ====
Tacoma, Washington, had a Chinatown in Downtown Tacoma near Railroad Street. In November 1885, disgruntled whites drove out the Chinese population. One historical account says 600 Chinese were dragged out to the street and forced to the train station; another says many who were driven out fled to Portland, Oregon, or Canada. Two days later, the whites burned Tacoma's Chinatown to the ground.

The Chinese Reconciliation Park commemorates the 1885 expulsion.

==== Walla Walla ====
Walla Walla, Washington, was once home to a small Chinatown.

=== Wyoming ===
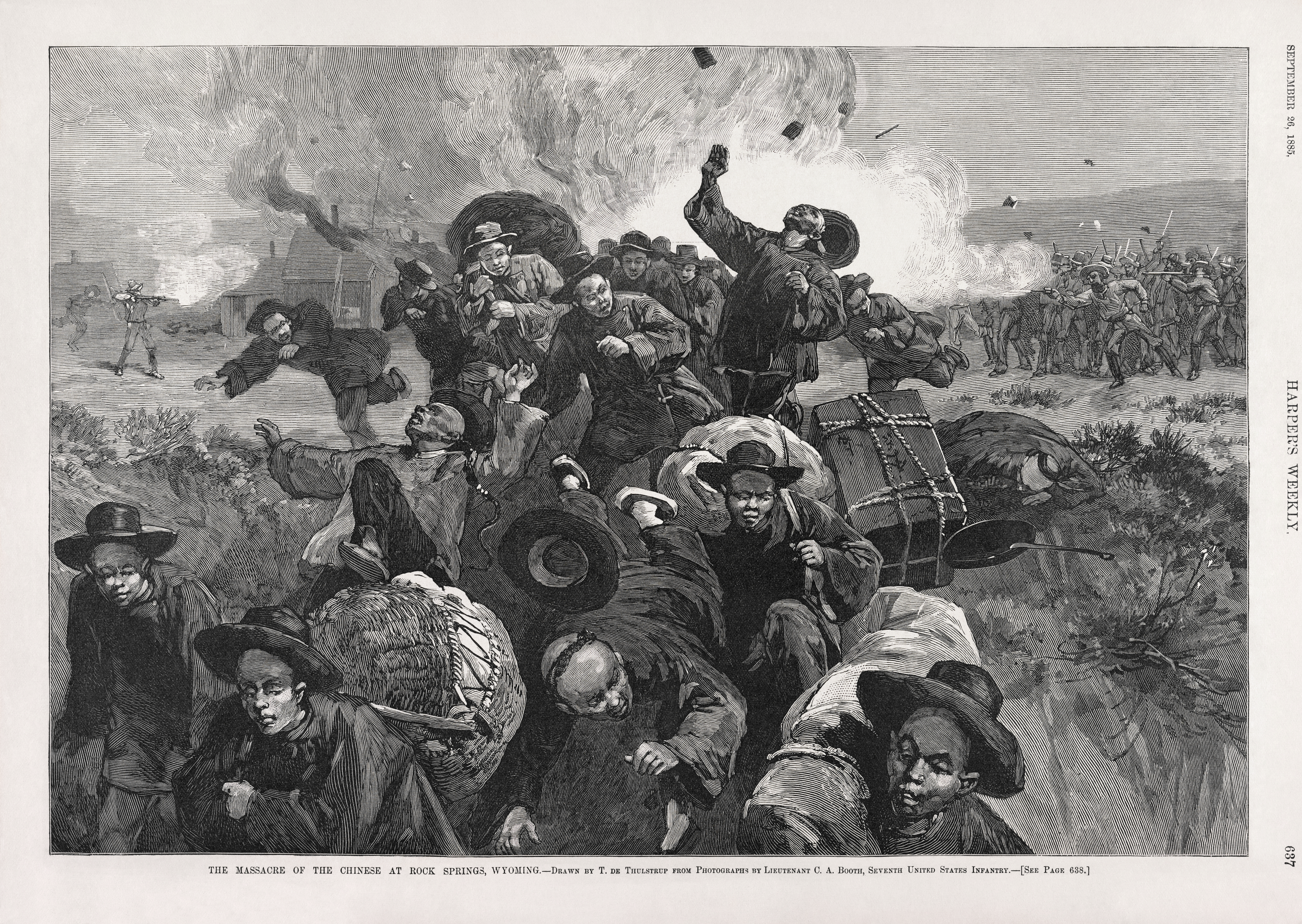
Rock Springs Massacre

The state of Wyoming had three Chinatowns between 1880 and 1927. In 1927, all three Chinatowns had vanished due to the Chinese Exclusion Act.

==== Almy, Evanston, and Rock Springs ====
Almy had the smallest of the three Chinatowns in Wyoming. This community was located seven miles north of Evanston's Chinatown. Evanston's was the most diverse of the three Chinatowns in Wyoming. The Rock Springs Chinatown was the largest of the three Chinatowns in Wyoming. This community was also located seven miles north of Evanston's Chinatown. It was the site of the infamous Rock Springs Massacre, in which many Chinese died.

== See also ==
- Temple of Kwan Tai located in Mendocino, California
- Bok Kai Temple located in the city of Marysville, California
- Kong Chow Temple located in San Francisco, California
- Tin How Temple in San Francisco's Chinatown, California
- Oroville Chinese Temple located in Oroville, California
- Ma-Tsu Temple in San Francisco's Chinatown
- Weaverville Joss House, located in the town of Weaverville, California
- Pao Fa Temple located in Irvine, California
- Hsi Lai Temple located in Puente Hills, Hacienda Heights
- City of Ten Thousand Buddhas located in Talmage, California
- Chuang Yen Monastery located in Kent, Putnam County, New York
- Chinese Progressive Association
- Chinese Americans
- History of Chinese Americans
- American Chinese cuisine
- China–United States relations
- Chinese Exclusion Act of 1882
- Scott Act, 1888 and Geary Act, 1892
- Anti-Chinese violence in Oregon
- Anti-Chinese violence in California
- Anti-Chinese violence in Washington
- Chinese massacre of 1871
- San Francisco riot of 1877
- Rock Springs massacre, 1885
- Attack on Squak Valley Chinese laborers, 1885
- Tacoma riot of 1885
- Seattle riot of 1886
- Hells Canyon massacre, 1887
