= Chinese church =

Chinese church may refer to:

- Christianity in China
  - Protestant (Three-Self Patriotic Movement or House church)
  - Catholic (Chinese Patriotic Catholic Association or Underground church)
  - Chinese Orthodox Church
- Chinese American church
