= Chinese American church =

Christian churches in United States

Chinese American church refers to Christian churches in the United States made up of predominantly ethnic Chinese congregations. The term is primary used to describe certain Protestant congregations found in large American cities, with a majority Chinese membership, and who typically offer bilingual services in both English and Chinese.

== Organization ==
Most Chinese American churches belong to non-ethnic denominations, or are non-denominational. A significant number of them are Baptist and/or refer to themselves as “bible churches”. Chinese American churches tend to be conservative Evangelical Protestant bodies, following some variation of Reformed theology.

== Cultural assimilation ==
Many Chinese churches originate to serve recent Chinese immigrants arriving from Greater China. Church services are usually conducted in Cantonese, Mandarin or other Chinese languages. With the growing numbers of children and youth, there is often an increased need for English-speaking programs to address subsequent generations.

As with other ethnic churches, Chinese American churches raise concerns around "assimilation" into the broader European American context versus preserving Chinese identity, especially with subsequent generations. On one level, this revolves around the preservation of the Chinese language. In other respects, questions of assimilation relate to the loss of Chinese culture, especially as found in Confucianism.

However, while the older generations tend to be less confident in English, many churches find themselves being "multi-congregational" by the fact that English-speaking younger generations are typically served under the same roof. According to this type of church organization and growth model, the problem occurs when the Chinese speaking congregation shrinks and leaves behind the larger non-Chinese speaking members. The failure to attract new members usually means the end of the church, especially when the original purpose of worship seems to be lost. In addition to worship service, generally, churches also serve ministries in their local community context.

== Notable churches ==
- Boston Chinese Evangelical Church in Boston and Newtonville, Massachusetts
- Bay Area Chinese Bible Church in Alameda, California
- Chinese Bible Church Detroit in Farmington Hills, Michigan
- Chinese Baptist Church in Seattle, Washington
- Chinese Bible Church of Greater Boston in Lexington, Massachusetts
- Chinese Bible Church of Greater Lowell in Chelmsford, Massachusetts
- Chinese Bible Church of Maryland in Rockville and Gaithersburg, Maryland
- Chinese Christian Union Church in Chicago, Illinois
- Chinese Evangelical Free Church of Los Angeles in Monterey Park, California
- Covenant of Grace Presbyterian Church in Briarwood, New York - belongs to the Presbyterian Church in America (PCA)
- Davis Chinese Christian Church
- First Chinese Baptist Church, Los Angeles in Chinatown, Los Angeles
- First Chinese Baptist Church of Fountain Valley in Fountain Valley, California
- First Evangelical Church Association in Southern California
- First Evangelical Community Chinese Church in Rochester Hills, Michigan
- Friendship Agape Church, San Jose, California
- Oversea Chinese Mission in New York, New York
- Pittsburgh Chinese Church
- Presbyterian Church in Chinatown, San Francisco Chinatown - the oldest Chinese church in North America
- Princeton Christian Church in Princeton, New Jersey
- Rutgers Community Christian Church in Somerset, New Jersey
- Reformed Church of Newtown in Elmhurst, New York - belongs to the Reformed Church in America (RCA)
- San Francisco Chinese Alliance Church
- San Jose Christian Alliance Church
- Sunset Church in San Francisco
- Trellis Bay Area church in San Leandro, California
- Trinity Christian Church of Greater Philadelphia in Havertown, Philadelphia
- Victory Baptist Chinese Church of Rochester in Rochester, New York
