= First Chinese Baptist Church of Fountain Valley =

Coordinates: 33.718531°N 117.954420°W

- First Chinese Baptist Church of Fountain Valley
- Location: 16835 Brookhurst Street Fountain Valley, CA, 92708
- Country: United States
- Denomination: Southern Baptist Convention
- Website: fcbcfv.org

History
- Founded: 1977
- Founder: Murphy Lum

Clergy
- Pastor(s): Tony Lin, Godfrey Hom, Steven Lee

First Chinese Baptist Church of Fountain Valley or FCBC-FV is an evangelical Christian Church located in Fountain Valley, California.

== History ==
FCBC-FV's first public service was held on February 20, 1977, with sixty-six people in attendance. In April 1981, the church acquired a new property on Hazard Ave. in Fountain Valley. The "Church Dedication service" was held on July 22, 1981.

In July 1994, construction began on the property of Fountain Valley, Construction finished, and the church began the first worship service held in the new property on November 21, 1994.

On January 1, 1995, "First Chinese Baptist Church of Fountain Valley" was incorporated as FCBCFV, with a "Church Dedication service" held twenty-one days later.
