= Chinese Baptist Church (Seattle, Washington) =

Historic church in Washington, United States

- U.S. National Register of Historic Places
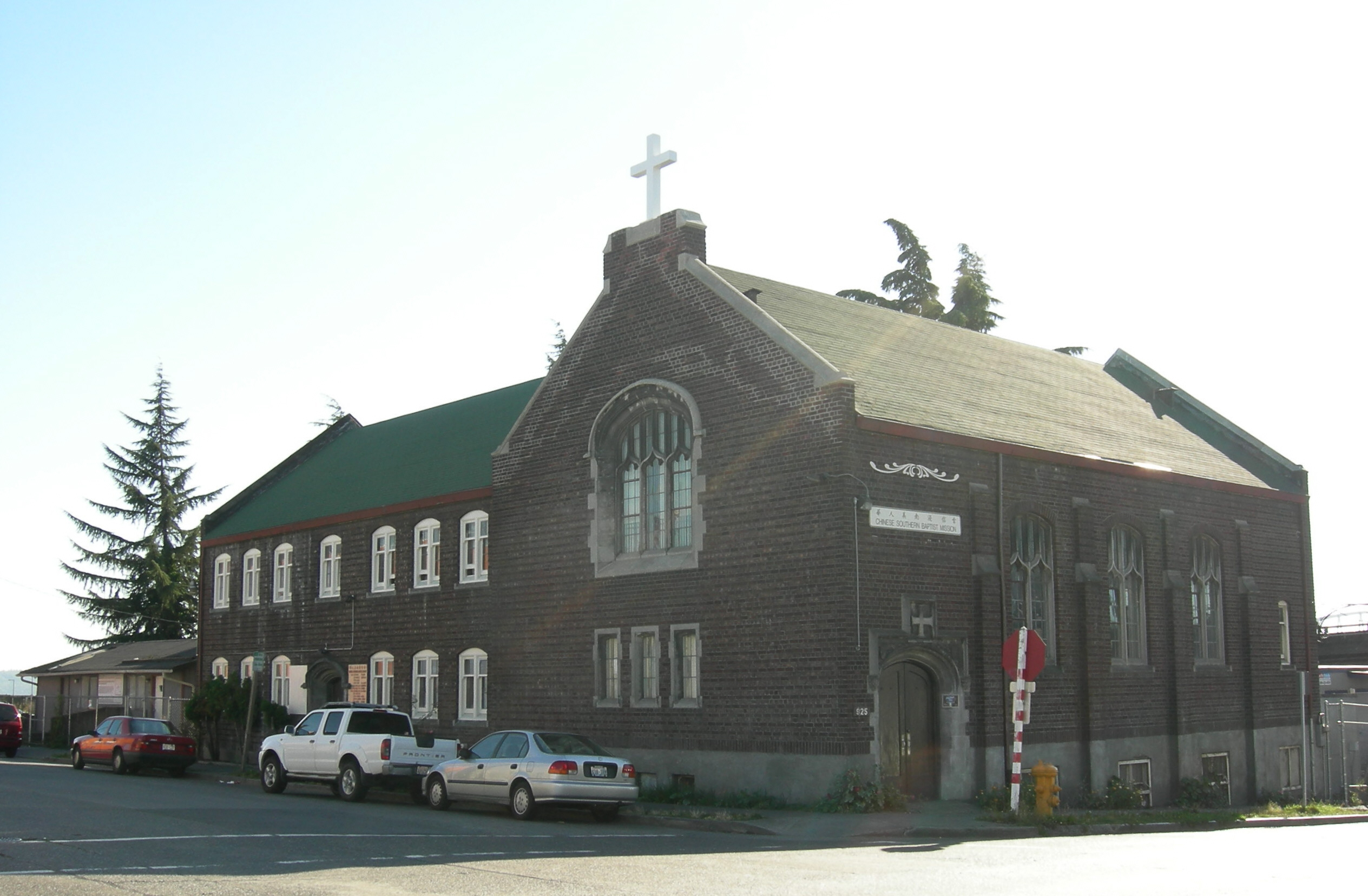

- Location within Downtown Seattle
- Location: 925 S. King St., Seattle, Washington
- Coordinates: 47°35′54″N 122°19′7″W
- Area: less than one acre
- Built: 1922
- Architect: Schack, Young & Meyers
- Architectural style: Late Gothic Revival
- NRHP reference No.: 86002094
- Added to NRHP: July 31, 1986

Chinese Baptist Church is a historic Baptist church building at 925 S. King Street in Seattle, Washington. It was constructed in a Late Gothic Revival style and was dedicated on October 12, 1922. The building was added to the National Register of Historic Places in 1986. The congregation of Chinese Baptist Church broke ground on their new location at 5801 Beacon Ave S., Seattle, WA on January 24, 1975, and dedicated the building on April 3, 1977.

== History ==
The church had its origin in the late nineteenth century, when the First Baptist Church of Seattle established missionary churches for several of the ethnic groups of foreign laborers in the area, including a Scandinavian Baptist Church (1883) and a Japanese Baptist Church (1899). A Committee on Chinese Work was established in 1892. It conducted a school and worship services in a house at 5th and Yesler, then moved to a larger building in the Chinese district. In 1902 funds were raised to construct a church at Washington and Maynard streets. No longer a "mission church" dependent on its sponsor, from that point on the church had Chinese pastors and was admitted to the Western Washington Baptist Convention. The church served as a focal point for the Chinese American community until 1977, when the congregation moved to a larger facility in Beacon Hill. The building is now the home of the Chinese Southern Baptist Church.
