= Chinese Progressive Association =

Chinese Progressive Association can refer to one of two organizations:

- Chinese Progressive Association (Boston)
- Chinese Progressive Association (San Francisco)
