= Pao Fa Temple =

Buddhist monastery and temple in California

Coordinates: 33.69204°N 117.82969°W

Pao Fa Temple (Chinese: 寶法寺; pinyin: Bǎofǎ Sì; Pe̍h-ōe-jī: Pó-hoat-sī) is one of the largest Buddhist monasteries and Buddhist temples in the United States.

The temple believes in the Dharma from its roots, the same as the Pao Chieh Chan Temple in Wugu, Taipei, and the Pao Shawn Chan Temple in Puli, Nanto, Taiwan.

It is located in Irvine, California. The construction of the temple in an area of two acres of land was completed in 2002. It is a $5-million Temple and the firs mega-temple in Orange County. It's 41,000 square feet of prayer halls, 8-ton jade Buddhas, classrooms, a library, dining hall and 42-room monastery.
