= Taoist Temple (Hanford, California) =

- U.S. National Register of Historic Places
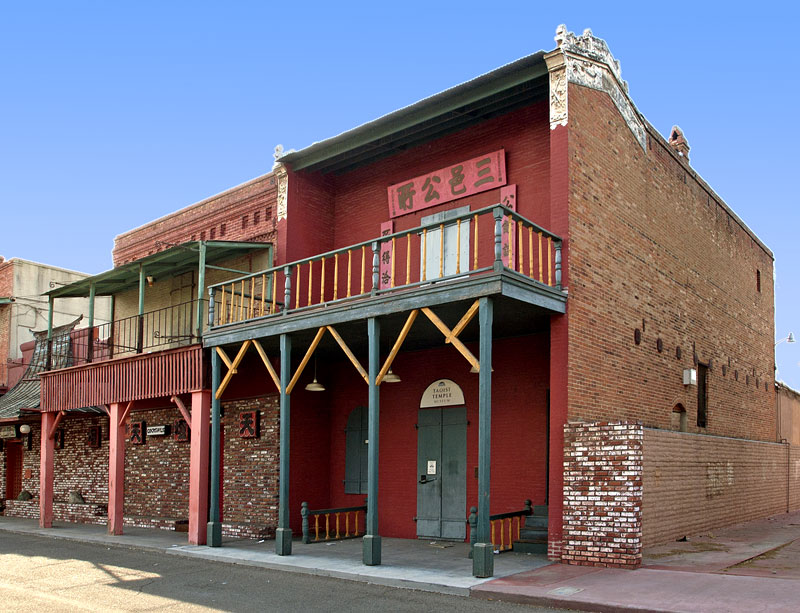

- Location within California Location within the United States
- Location: No. 12 China Alley, Hanford, California
- Coordinates: 36°19′41″N 119°38′16″W
- Area: 0.1 acres (0.040 ha)
- Built: 1893
- NRHP reference No.: 72000226
- Added to NRHP: June 13, 1972

The Taoist Temple at No. 12 China Alley in Hanford, in Kings County, California, dates from 1893. Also known as the Kwan Tai Temple, It was listed on the U.S. National Register of Historic Places (NRHP) in 1972.

== Background ==
It is historically significant as a surviving authentic structure from Hanford's Chinatown, after it moved to the 200-foot-long China Alley in the 1890s, after a fire in the previous Chinatown area. China Alley served the second largest population of Chinese in the U.S., behind San Francisco. The temple itself was argued in its NRHP nomination to be valuable "as an example of typical late 19th century indigenous construction, with oriental overtones.... in keeping with the theme of the original Hanford Chinese settlement and with the buildings still remaining."

The Taoist Temple Museum is open for tours once a month.

China Alley, where the temple is located, was listed as one of the 11 most endangered historic places in America in 2011 by the National Trust for Historic Preservation.

On the evening of May 12, 2021, the building was heavily damaged by fire. Although the building itself did not sustain structural damage, the fire still caused severe smoke and heat damage to the second-floor temple room and its artifacts, which will require significant clean up and conservation.

== See also ==
- Bok Kai Temple (北溪廟) located in the city of Marysville, California
- Kong Chow Temple (岡州古廟) located in San Francisco, California
- Oroville Chinese Temple (列聖宮) located in Oroville, California
- Temple of Kwan Tai (武帝廟) located in Mendocino, California
- Tin How Temple (天后古廟) in San Francisco's Chinatown, California
- Weaverville Joss House (雲林廟), located in the center of the town of Weaverville, California
- Imperial Dynasty restaurant
