= Oroville Chinese Temple =

- U.S. National Register of Historic Places
- California Historical Landmark
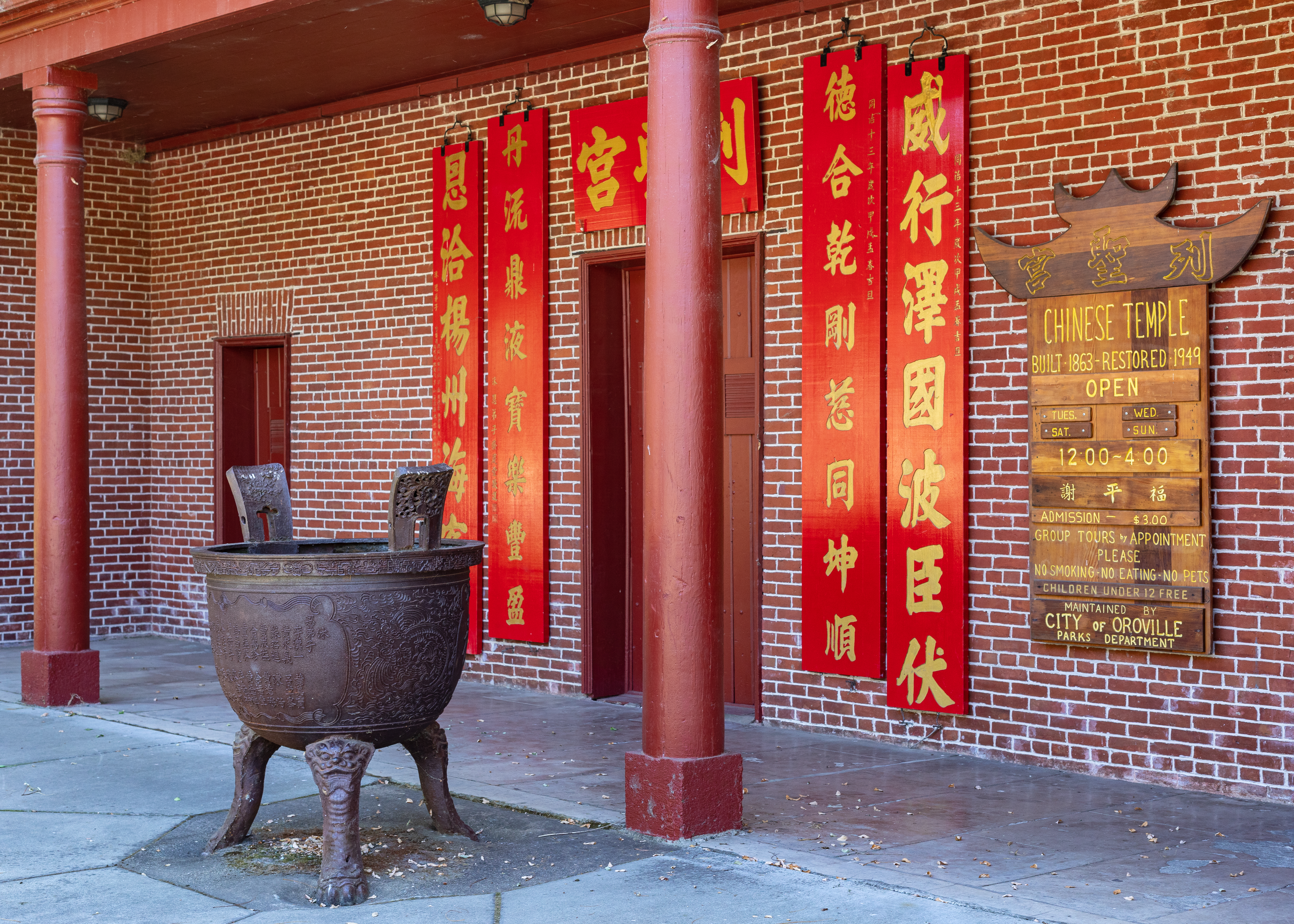

- Location within California Location within the United States
- Location: 1500 Broderick St., Oroville, California
- Coordinates: 39°30′49″N 121°33′39″W
- Built: 1863
- NRHP reference No.: 76000478
- CHISL No.: 770
- Added to NRHP: July 30, 1976

The Oroville Chinese Temple (列聖宮) is a Chinese folk religious temple built in 1863 in Oroville, California. The temple is now owned by the City of Oroville and open to the public as a museum, and it also continues to be used occasionally for worship.

== History ==
In the latter half of the 19th century there were as many as 10,000 Chinese in the Oroville, California area. Just as with many of those that arrived in the area, they came primarily in search of gold. Starting with the California Gold Rush ca. 1849, the Chinese arrivals in Oroville for the first 20 years were only men since they were not allowed to bring their families. Most of these were from the Canton and Shanghai provinces. They brought little with them except their rich heritage, the will to succeed and the desire to return home wealthy.

Shortly after arriving in Oroville around 1850, the Chinese population pooled existing resources and built the first Chinese temple in the area. This temple, constructed of wood, burned down as did a second rebuilt structure. The third structure and furnishings, funded by the Tongzhi Emperor and Empress Xiaozheyi, was built of red brick acquired from Palermo, California and was completed in September 1863. This is the same structure that exists on the site today.

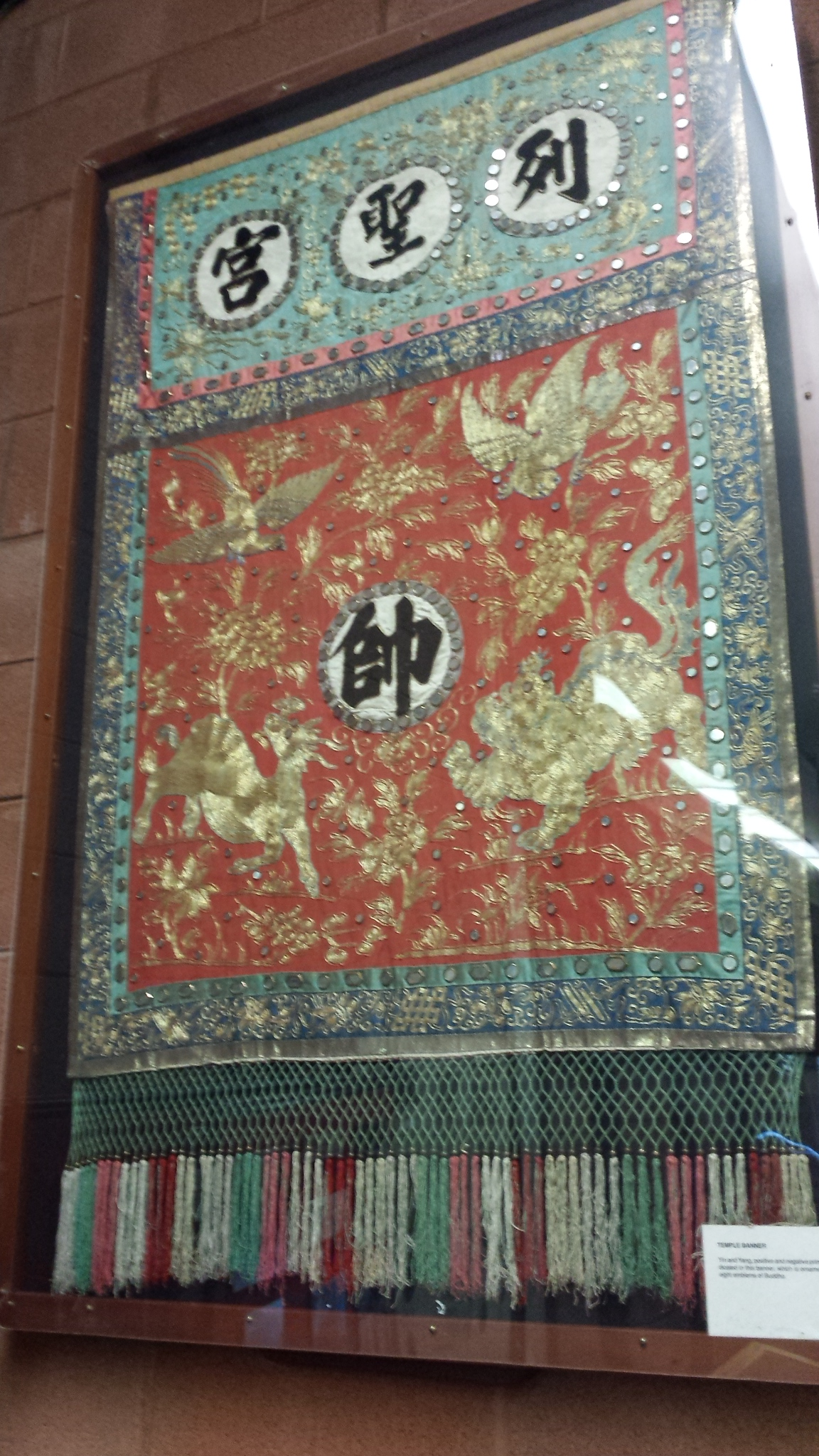
Temple Banner

Over the years the structure withstood many fires and floods. However, in 1907 a massive flood caused damage affecting not only the temple but the entire Oroville area. This disaster combined with a concurrent economic depression in the United States resulted in a large exodus of Chinese from the area to other larger U.S. cities and back to China. Remaining Chinese continued to maintain the Chinese Temple complex (especially the Chan family) until the 1930s. During the 1930s a decision was made among these families to deed the complex to the City of Oroville and in 1937 the city officially took ownership of the complex. Three stipulations were guaranteed to the Chinese families for their contribution. The first was an agreement that the city would build a museum to house artifacts that the former complex did not have room to display. The second was to ensure that all three temples would remain available to the community to use for worship. The third and final was to teach volunteers at the center about the Chinese culture, beliefs and artifacts so that visitors could better understand these in context with their visit to the center. After construction of the promised structure was completed, the center reopened to visitors in July 1949. The temple was originally composed of three parts: the Chan Room for Confucian meditation, the Moon Temple, for Buddhist rites, and the Council Room, for community functions. Afterwards a number of modern additions have been made, including a Chinese tapestry hall, a display hall and a Chinese garden.

On the 10 April 2021, the Chinese Temple museum re-opened to the public following a one-year closure due to COVID-19 restrictions. The museum is open on Wednesdays and Saturdays from 10 a.m. until 2 p.m.

== Original temple and rooms ==
=== Main temple ===
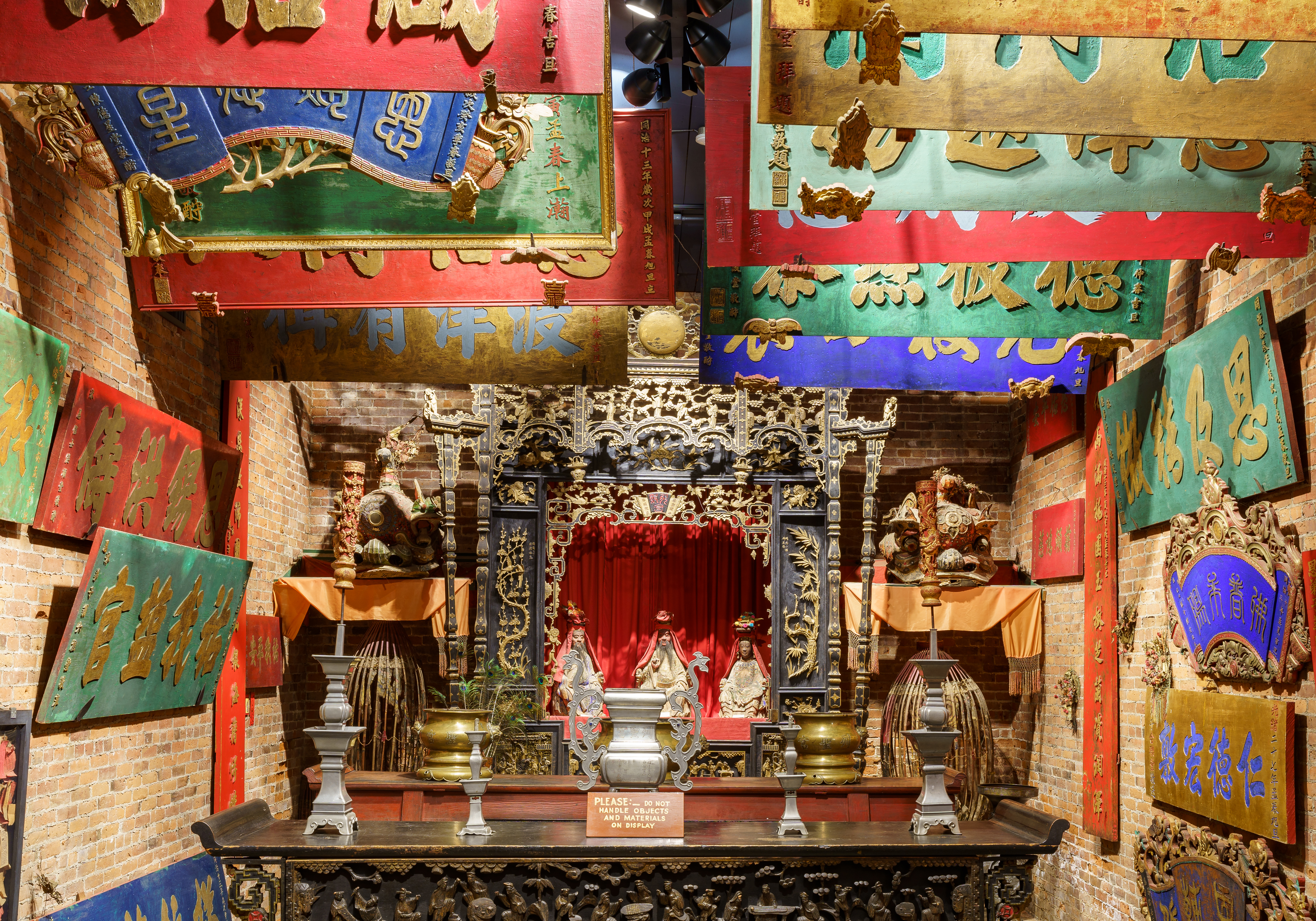
Main Temple Interior

The oldest of the brick temples was completed in 1863 and is named Liet Sheng Kong which translated means "Temple of Many Gods and Goddesses". In this temple visitors were allowed to worship any deity that they wishes to. The interior ceiling and walls of this building are covered with hanging boards with carvings or script to honored or thanking the Chinese deities for answering prayers. The room houses three altars. One teak altar at the front of the temple, brought to the temple from China, shows an elaborately carved courtyard scene, The second altar is used for supporting incense burners and the third (also from China) sits at the back wall of the temple. This altar support three carved, wooden statues representing Chinese deities. On the top sides of this altar there are 2 papier-mâché Southern lion heads employed by the Chinese to ward away evil spirits. These heads were also employed during Chinese festival parades in the area. Just inside of the temple there is a gong and just outside the temple's entry point there is a very large ceremonial urn which also originated from China.

=== Chan Room ===
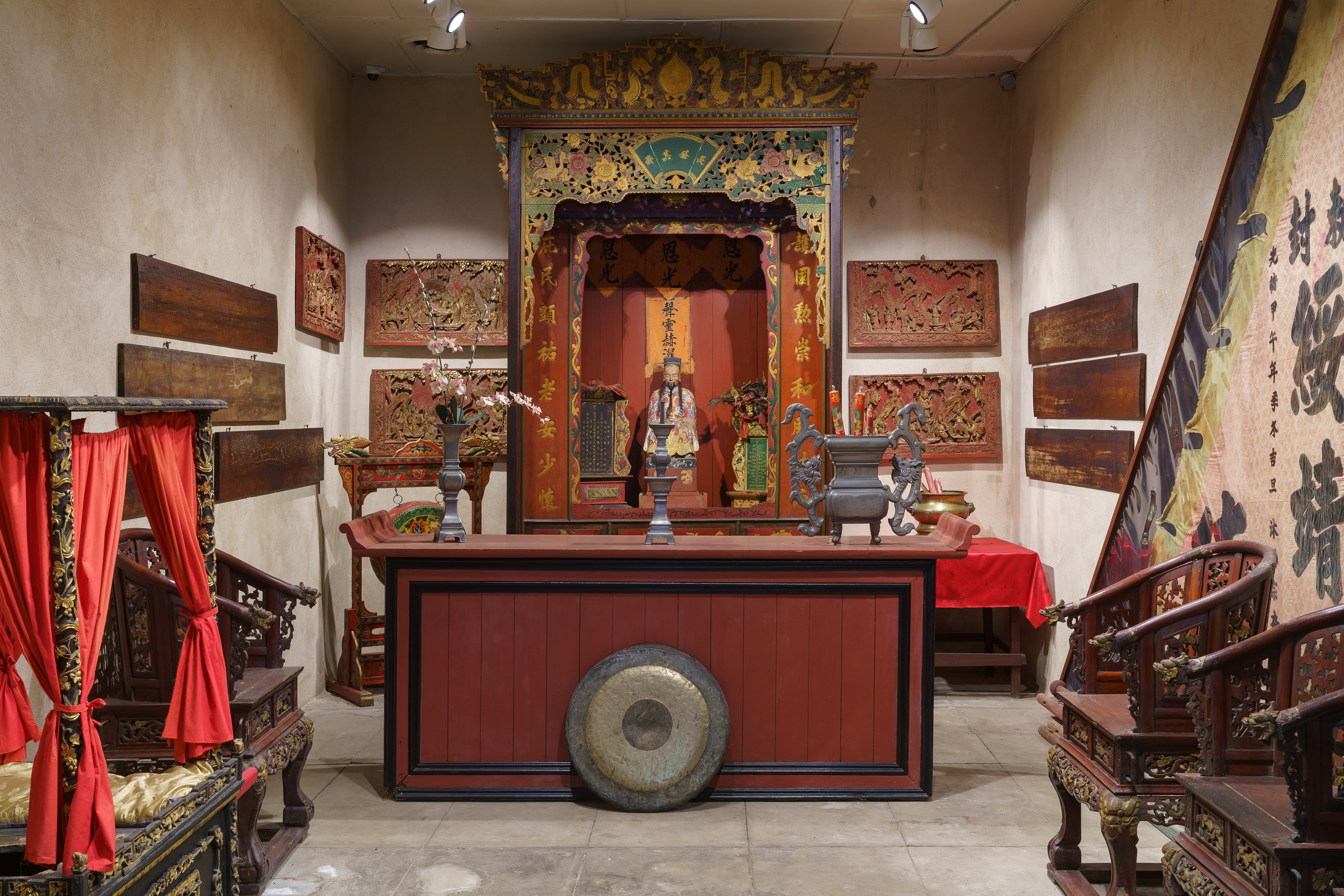
The Chan Room

Built in 1864, the Chan Room (adjacent to the Main Temple) is also referred to as "Suey Cing Bak". The room was constructed in remembrance of general Chan Low Kwan (Song Dynasty) who was also referred to as the "Viscount of Purification". As a note of reference, all by the name of Chan or Chin (Wong Tun district, Toy Sun county of Guangdong province) were direct descendants of Chan Low Kwan. There are many artifacts in this room but one that is most noteworthy is a large, teak bridal sedan chair of Chinese Imperial Palace quality. Equipped with curtains, the chair was used in parades and wedding ceremonies.

=== Council Room ===
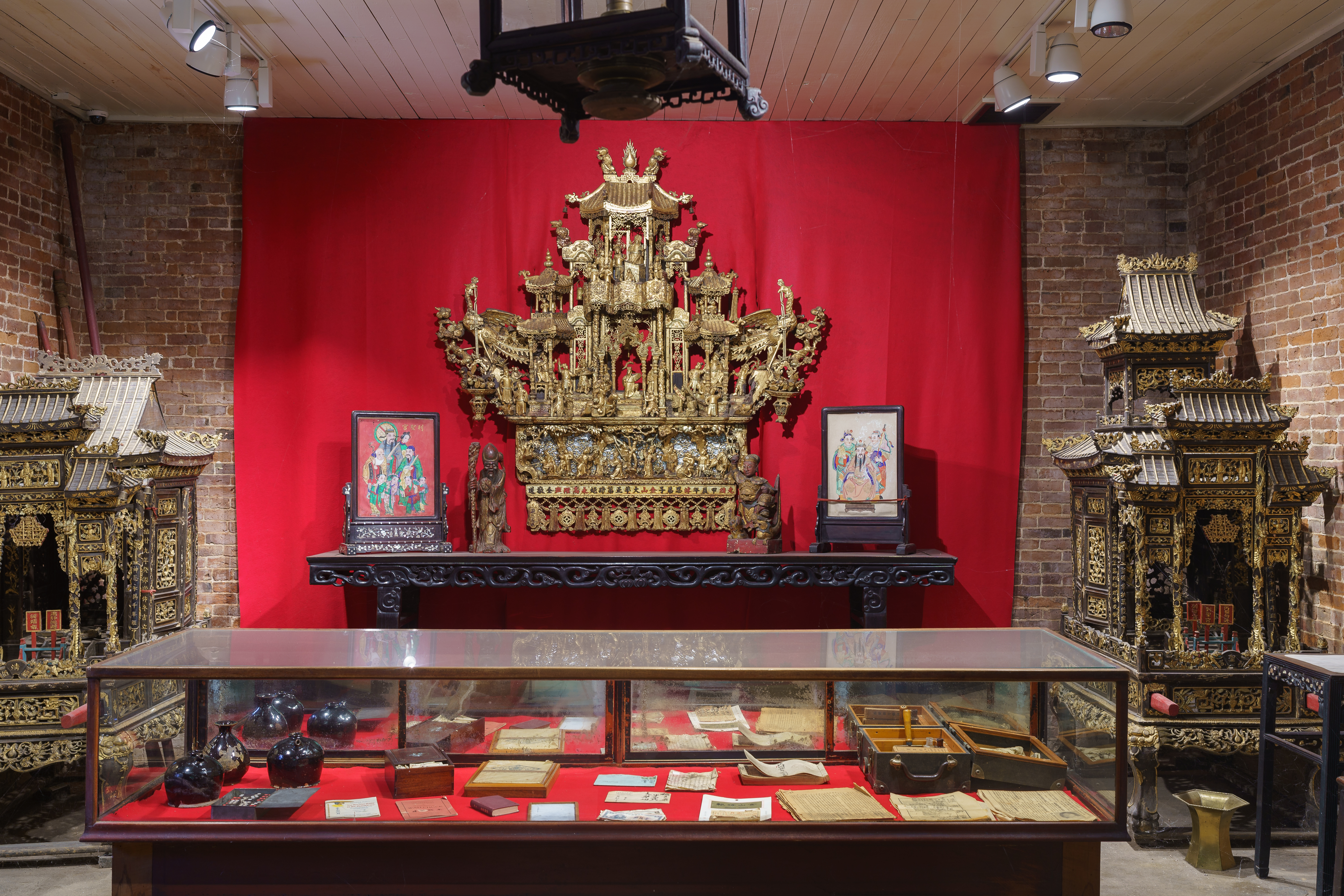
The Council Room

Built in 1868, the Council Room houses a beautiful hanging screen of carved wood with gold leaf overlay. Also in the room are two procession shrines which were carried in parades during Chinese festivals. The room was used primarily for business transactions. Since there were few literate Chinese in Oroville in the latter 19th century, It is surmised that the few learned Chinese men in Oroville at the time assisted others in recording their transactions.

=== Moon Room ===
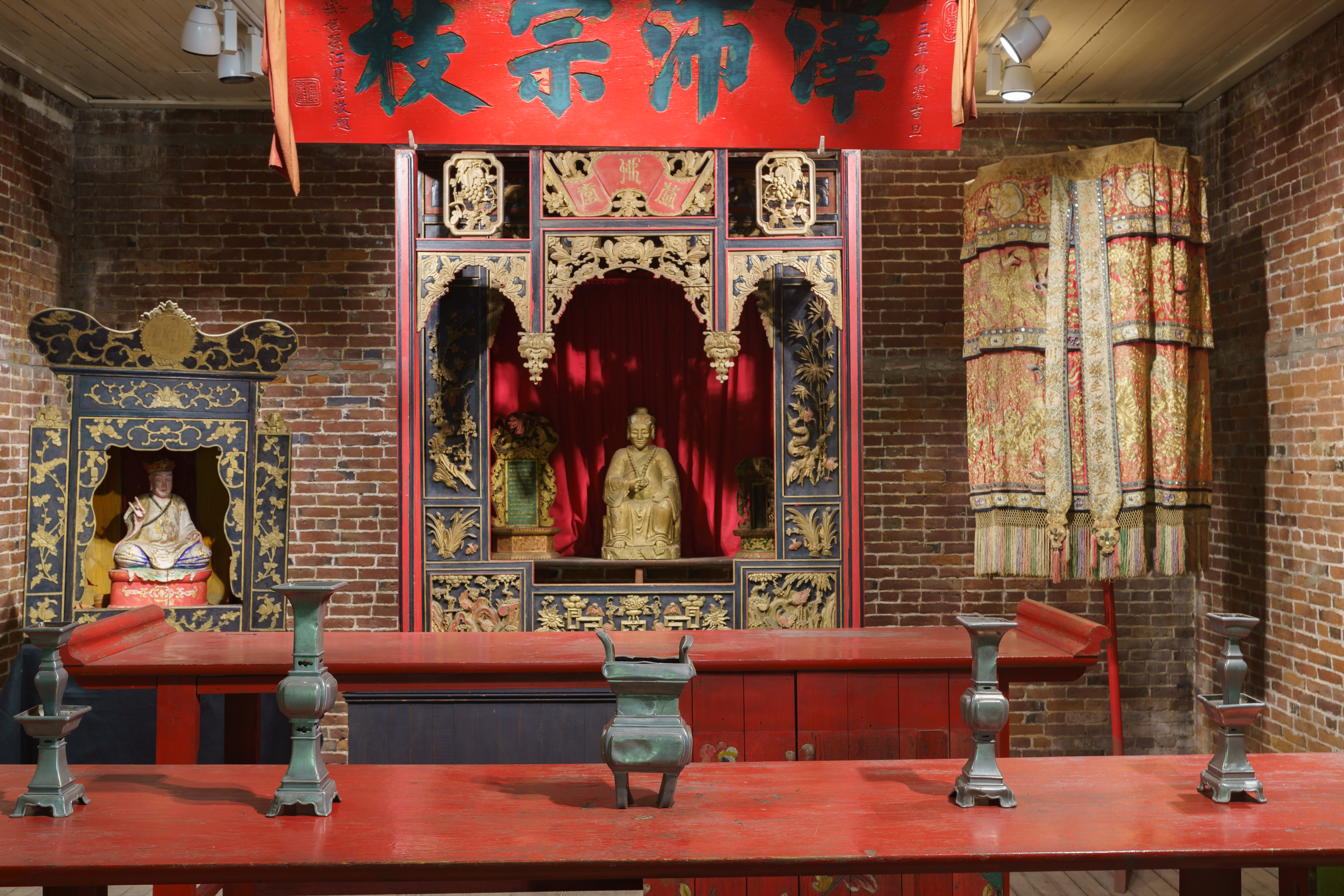
The Moon Room

Built in 1868 on the floor above the Council Room is the Moon Room or "Wong Fut Tong". The Moon Room gets its name from the unique circular door. This room is devoted to Buddha and houses three statues, one of which is reaching out his hand to display the "sign of wisdom". The main color motif is red, symbolic color of good look in the Buddhist tradition.

== Later additions ==
=== Tapestry Hall ===
Built and dedicated in 1968, the Tapestry Hall houses Chinese tapestries, parade umbrellas, a 16th-century imperial pillar rug, a bronze urn and a collection of Chinese artifacts. Noteworthy also are a unique collection of antique shadow puppets constructed of donkey skin. These puppets were used in dramas that helped educate Chinese regarding their own culture and were especially important to educate Chinese that were unable to read or write the Chinese language.

=== Display Hall ===
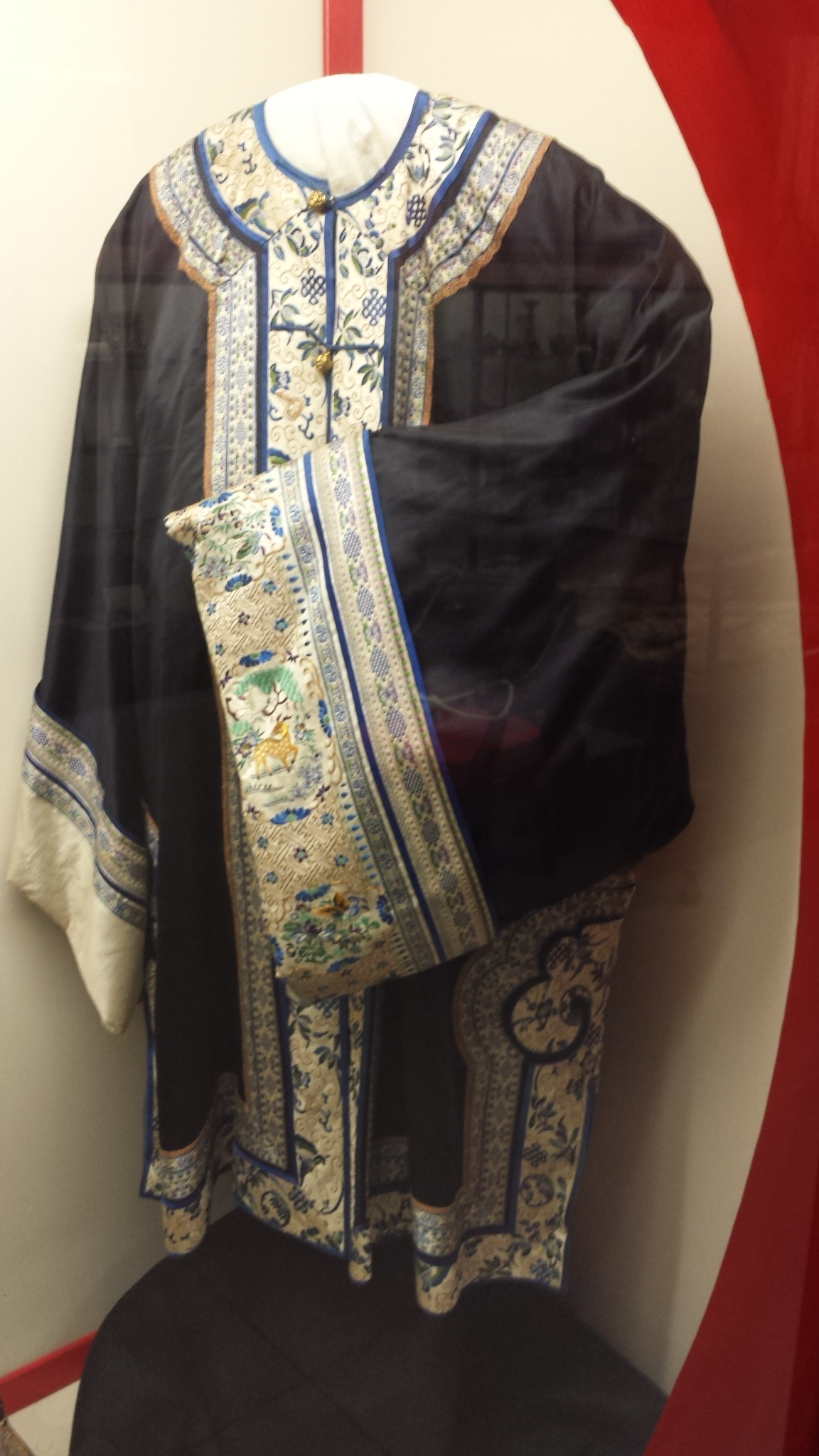
Chinese Frock

This Display Hall, also dedicated in 1968, was built to present artifacts that were given to the Chinese Temple. Artifacts housed here include Chinese costumes, furniture, and other items depicting the daily life of the Chinese.

Also housed in the room are tapestries and decorative items. One specific item of interest is a pair of shoes that were formerly worn by a woman with bound feet. This room also has a collection of large paper mache puppets which were used by the Chinese in their theater when actors where unavailable to perform. These puppets were originally brought to the Oroville by puppeteers who emigrated from China but were left behind when many returned to their home country.

=== Cullie Room ===
This room was added to the complex as an American Bicentennial project in 1976. Funds for the project were donated by local philanthropist Charlotte Cullie. Clothing and artifacts housed in the room were donated by two Chinese missionaries (Mabel Clay and Jessie Mae Henke).

Specifically noteworthy to the collections are mannequins depicting both Chinese and United States historical clothing fashions from 1840 to 1940. This collection was donated to the city of Oroville in 1976.

=== Garden ===
The courtyard garden was established in 1968 and is populated with flora which are native to China except for a small number of annuals used to add additional color to the garden. The garden also includes a pond populated with lily pads and koi fish.

The Chinese garden, which has evolved over three thousand years, is historically used as a tranquil place for prayer, meditation and quiet conversation.

=== Workers Hut ===
In 1976 a historical replica of a Chinese gold miner's hut was built out of barn wood dating back to the 1860s. It originally appeared as a Butte County contribution to the California State Fair and was later donated to be an exhibit on the Orville Oriental Temple grounds.

=== Fong Lee Room ===
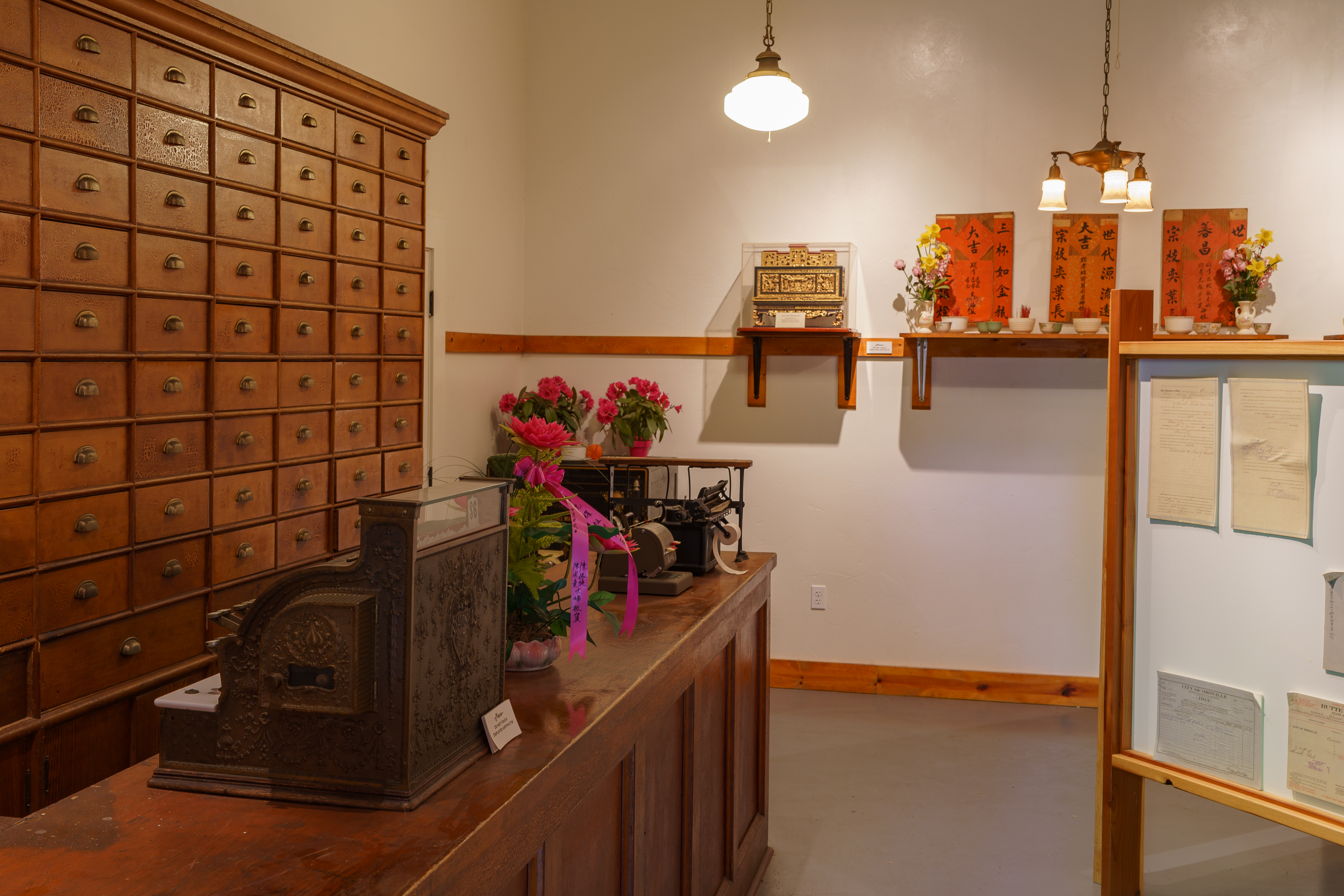
Apothecary Cabinet for Herbal Remedies c1860

The newest room at the Oroville Oriental Temple was funded by the Chin (Chan) Shew Ting family trust as a means of honoring Chin Kong Yu who was one of the first Chinese shopkeepers in the Oroville area. Dedicated on April 16, 2008, this room houses a Chinese apothecary cabinet originally used to hold herbal remedies. Also housed in the room are period gold scales and items used in gold transactions. The room represents a replica of their shop and is furnished with light fixtures, cabinets, cases and other items that were in the original shop of Chin Kong Yu during the late 19th century.

== See also ==
- Auburn Joss House, located in Auburn, California
- Temple of Kwan Tai (武帝廟) located in Mendocino, California
- Bok Kai Temple (北溪廟) located in the city of Marysville, California
- Kong Chow Temple (岡州古廟) located in San Francisco, California
- Tin How Temple (天后古廟) in San Francisco's Chinatown, California
- Ma-Tsu Temple (美國舊金山媽祖廟朝聖宮) in San Francisco's Chinatown, California
- Weaverville Joss House (雲林廟), located in the center of the town of Weaverville, California
- National Register of Historic Places listings in Butte County, California
