= Weaverville Joss House State Historic Park =

State park in Weaverville, California

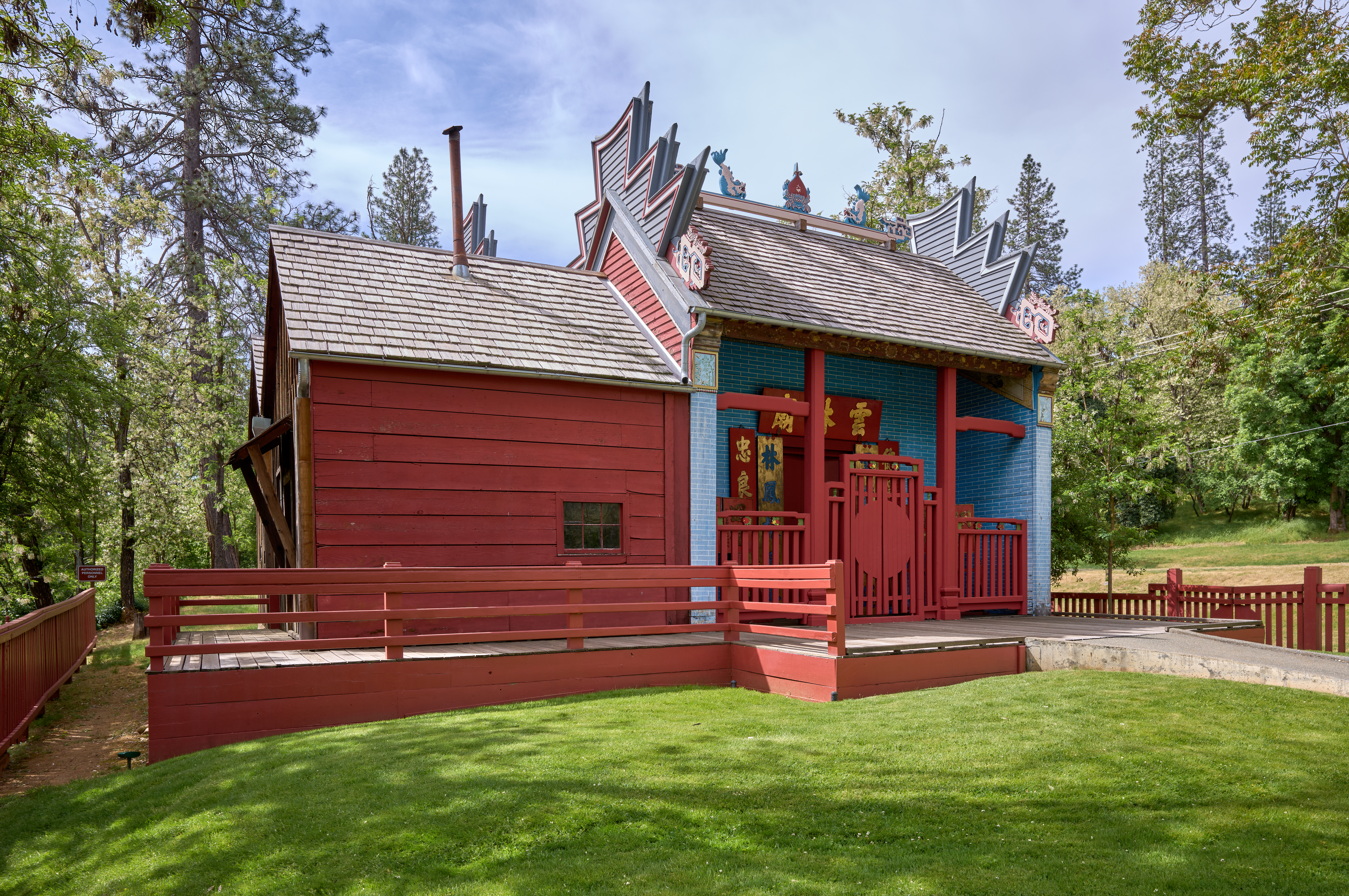
- Joss House in May 2025

- Location within California Location within the United States
- Location: Weaverville, California
- Coordinates: 40.7311°N 122.9408°W
- Governing body: State of California

California Historical Landmark
- Reference no.: 709

Weaverville Joss House State Historic Park is a state park located in the center of the town of Weaverville, California. The site is a Taoist temple which is still in use, and is the oldest Chinese temple in California.

== History ==
The original temple was built in 1853 by Chinese goldminers during the California gold rush.

The current building, called The Temple among the Forest beneath the Clouds (雲林廟), was built in 1874 to replace earlier structures which had been destroyed by fires. In 1934, much of the material in the building was taken during a robbery. The state decided that, in order to protect the historic nature of the material, a local resident, Moon Lim Lee, would be named trustee for the site. In 1956, after Moon Lim Lee fought tirelessly advocating for the site to become a state park, the site officially became a state historic site.

In 1989, a box was left at the visitor center. It contained one of the Chinese Guardian Lions which had been stolen in the 1934 theft. The state of California commissioned a new pair of dogs to place on display in the temple. The new dogs were created by traditional craftsmen in China.

Much of the material on display inside the temple includes temple equipment, objects of Chinese art, and clay statues.

== Current temple ==
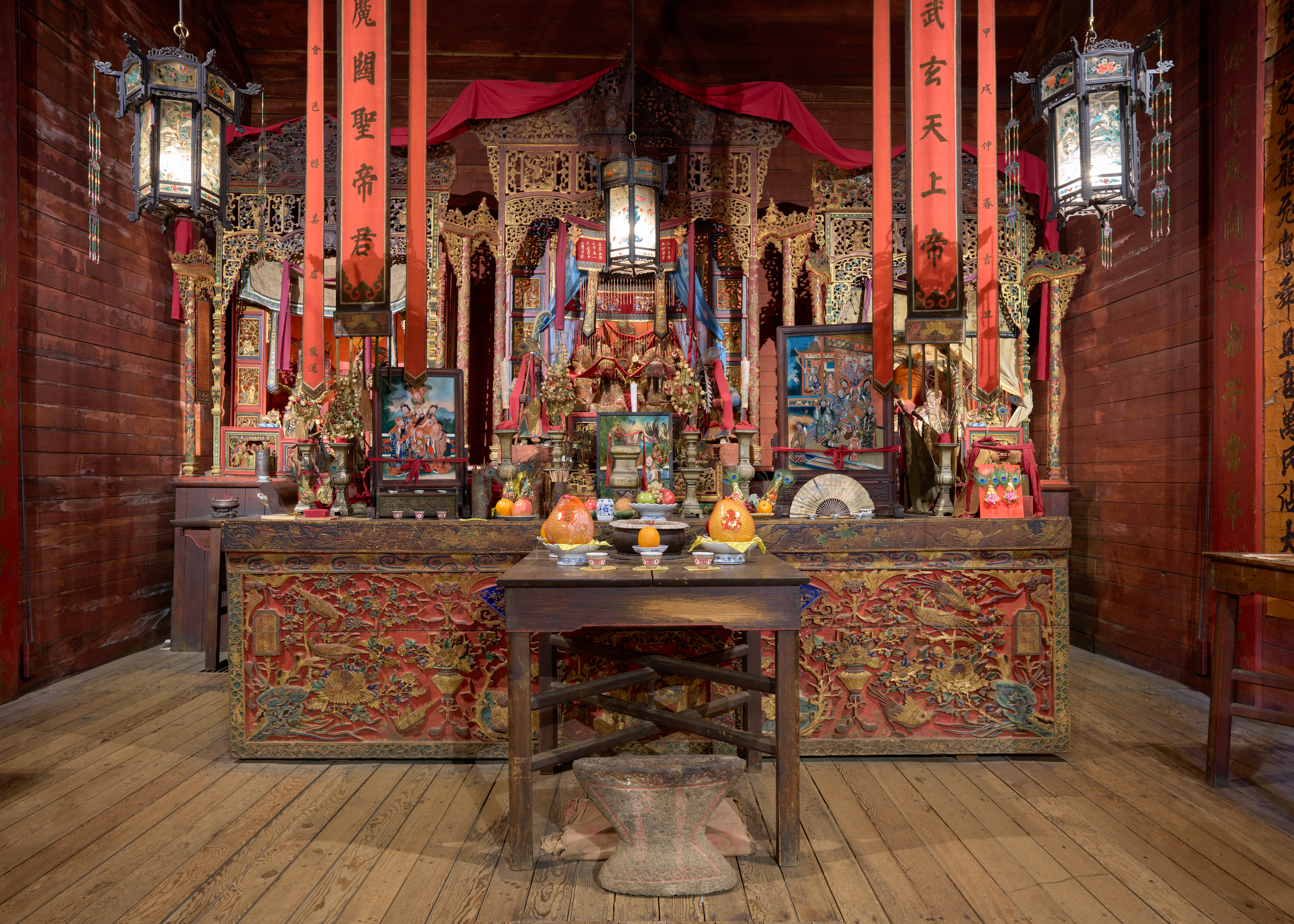
Interior view (2025)

Each year, to celebrate the Chinese New Year, a lion dance is performed.

The interior of the temple remains the same as it looked when it was built, although safety railings and electric lights have been added. On the grounds, there is a recently added parking lot, visitor center, and reflecting pool. Worship is still practiced at the temple. The temple is located at the southwest corner of Main Street (California State Route 299) and Oregon Street in Weaverville.

== See also ==
- Auburn Joss House, located in Auburn, California
- Temple of Kwan Tai (武帝廟) located in Mendocino, California
- Bok Kai Temple (北溪廟) located in the city of Marysville, California
- Kong Chow Temple (岡州古廟) located in San Francisco, California
- Tin How Temple (天后古廟) in San Francisco's Chinatown, California
- Oroville Chinese Temple (列聖宮) located in Oroville, California
- Ma-Tsu Temple (美國舊金山媽祖廟朝聖宮) in San Francisco's Chinatown, California
- Thien Hau Temple (天后宮) located in Los Angeles's Chinatown in California
- California Historical Landmark
- California Historical Landmarks in Trinity County, California
