= Temple of Kwan Tai =

Chinese Taoist temple in Mendocino, California

Temple of Kwan Tai 武帝廟
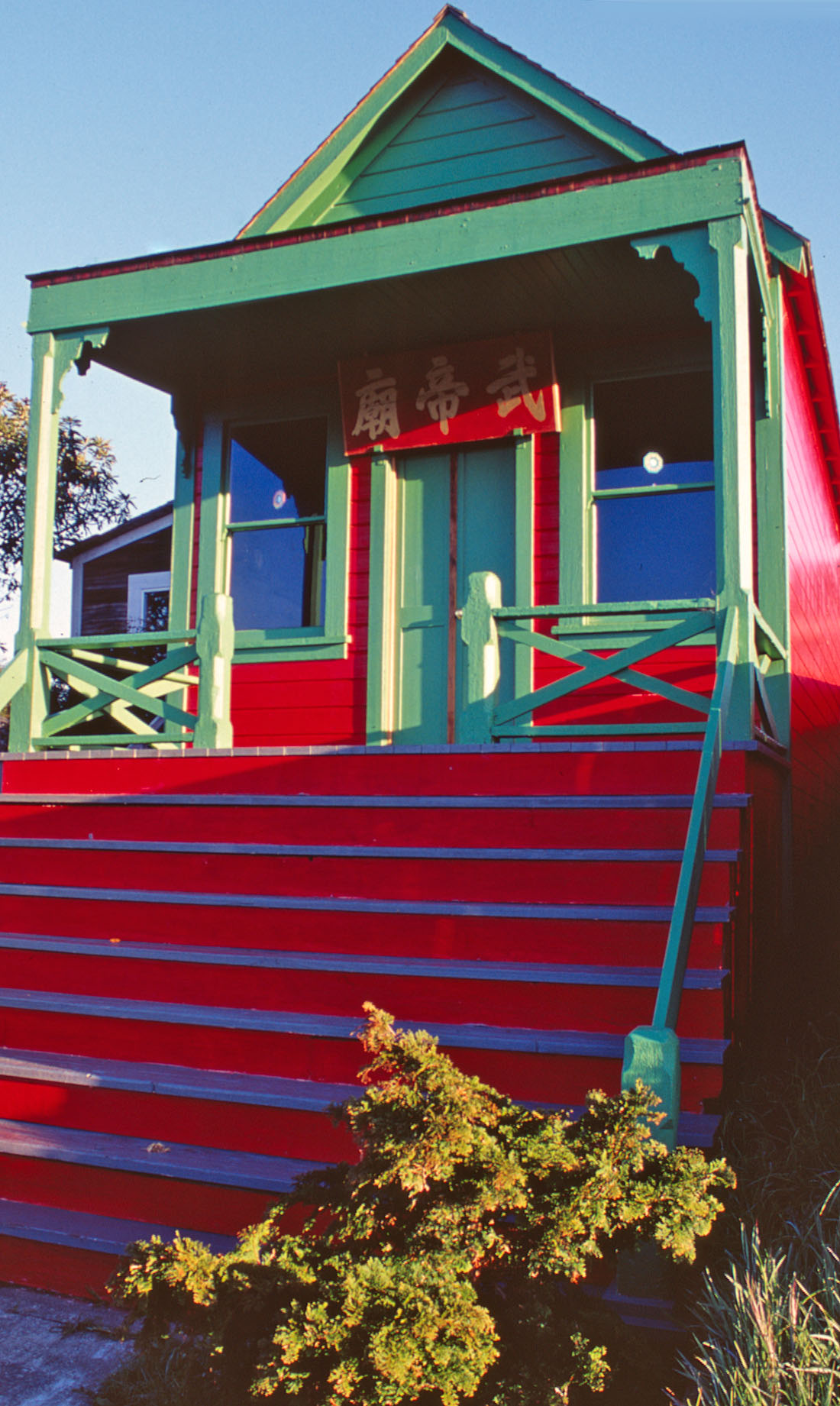
- Temple of Kwan Tai exterior

Religion
- Affiliation: Chinese Taoist

Location
- Location: Mendocino, California, USA
- Interactive map of Temple of Kwan Tai 武帝廟
- Coordinates: 39.305°N 123.803°W

Architecture
- Materials: Coast Redwood
- California Historical Landmark
- Reference no.: 927

Website
- kwantaitemple.org

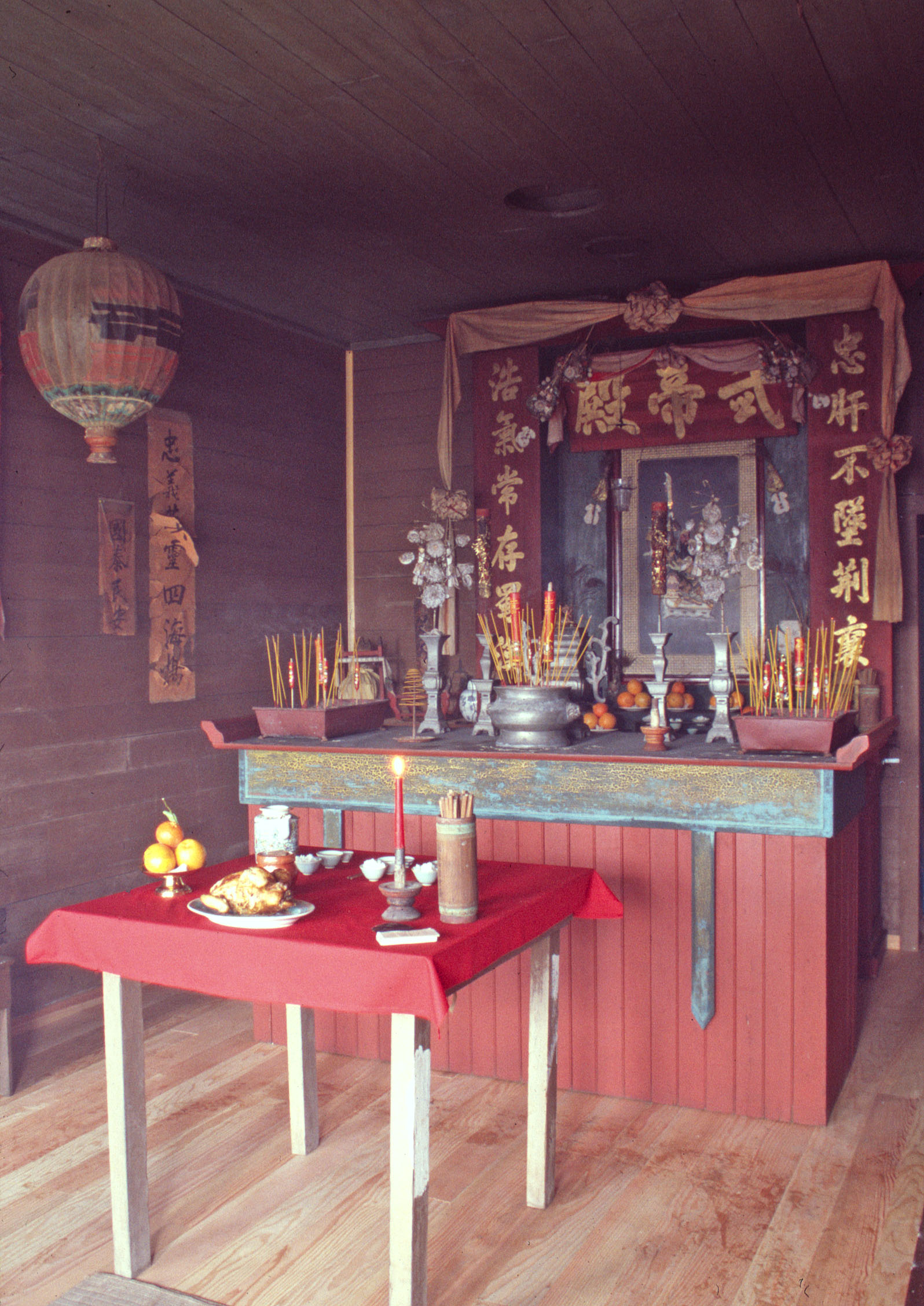
The altar of the temple, with the image of Kwan Tai, Guan Ping, and Zhou Cang hanging behind the altar table

The Temple of Kwan Tai (Chinese: 武帝廟; pinyin: Wǔdì miào; Yale: Móuhdai Míu, also known as the Mendocino Joss House or Mo Dai Miu) is a Chinese Taoist temple in Mendocino, California, dedicated to Kwan Tai. It is California Historical Landmark #927.

The temple was constructed from local redwood in the mid-19th century and served what was once a large population of Chinese immigrants who worked in or supported the lumber industry in Mendocino, including survivors from a fleet of Chinese junks that sailed to California for the gold rush and landed instead on the Mendocino coast. The temple's ownership was passed down through Chinese families until, in 1995, a nonprofit organization was formed to restore and maintain the temple.

It continues to be used both as a house of worship and to educate visitors about the history of Chinese Americans. It is one of the oldest continuously used Chinese temples in California, the only remaining joss house on the northern California coast, and the only remaining building from the Chinese community in Mendocino.

== Description ==
The Temple of Kwan Tai is a small brightly painted red and green redwood building with two doors, three windows, and a gable roof, located at 45160 Albion St in Mendocino, facing south toward the Pacific Ocean. Nine steps lead from the street level to the front door, a number that "is said to fend off evil spirits". The name of the temple is written over the door, in Chinese characters pronounced in Cantonese as "Mo Dai Miu" or "Military God-king Temple". The main room of the temple is approximately 264 square feet (24.5 m^{2}) in area; a small room at the rear of the building, originally the temple keeper's quarters, is now used as an office.

The temple is dedicated to the deified Han Dynasty general known in Cantonese as Kwan Tai (關帝; or Guan Di in Mandarin) and holds in its main altar an image of Kwan Tai flanked by generals Liu Bei and Zhang Fei, decorated in shell and glass on a black fabric background. A table in front of the altar holds five pewter altarpieces. Signboards recording prayers and donations are displayed on the temple walls, a collection of flags, drums, and baskets stands to the left of the altar, and the room also holds two wooden benches and a furnace for burning offerings. Taoist mandalas hang in the two front windows.

== Construction and initial usage ==
Like the other settlers in Mendocino County, Chinese laborers came to the area to work in the lumber industry. In one incident in 1854, a Chinese junk landed at Caspar, just north of Mendocino, one of two surviving ships from a fleet of seven that had sailed to California. One of the passengers on this ship, Joe Lee or Chong Sung, was one of the builders of the temple, and his descendants continue to maintain it and worship there. Over the next few decades, Mendocino had a substantial population of 500 to 700 Chinese immigrants, who worked there as cooks, servants, and shopkeepers, as well as working in the lumber industry as water slingers (people who kept the trails wet so that the cut logs could slide more easily). Chinese farmers also grew fruit and vegetables for local consumption in gardens now located on the grounds of the Stanford Inn, and gathered and processed seaweed for export back to China. Some of the descendants of these immigrants, such as Look Tin Eli and his brother Lee Eli, became successful and wealthy businessmen.

An oral account by Mendocino resident George Hee (a grandson of one of its builders) states that the temple was originally built in 1854; however, other sources date it to 1852 or 1867, and the earliest record of it is an insurance company map from 1883. Its original building materials cost only US$14. It was enlarged in the 1870s, and at that time had a full-time priest; it was open at all hours to the Chinese population, but white people were not permitted entry.

== Inheritance and restoration ==
The temple ownership was passed down from Hee's grandfather to his mother, Yip Lee; she had ten sons, and in turn passed the ownership to Hee despite the return of her husband to China. Mendocino's Chinatown burned down in 1910, and over the years, the other Chinese left the area until only Hee was left. He married a white woman in the early 1940s, defying anti-miscegenation laws in California that remained in force until the 1948 court decision Perez v. Sharp, and in turn passed the property to his two daughters, Loretta Hee McCoard and Lorraine Hee-Chorley. In 1995, they donated it to the Temple of Kwan Tai, Inc., a nonprofit corporation formed to maintain it.

The Temple of Kwan Tai is now the only remaining joss house on the northern California coast. It was named as California Historical Landmark #927 in 1979, at which time an architectural report dated it to the early 1850s.

The building was restored beginning in 1998 and 1999, under the guidance of architect Laura Culberson and with funding from the National Trust for Historic Preservation and the California Coastal Resources Agency. These restorations included the replacement of the foundations, east wall, and floor of the building, the addition of insulation, and repainting, the placement of a commemorative plaque noting its status as a historic landmark, and the replacement of the original silk-screened canvas altarpiece (damaged during the restoration process) by a replica purchased in Chinatown, San Francisco. The temple was rededicated in October 2001 in a religious and cultural ceremony featuring a parade, a lion dance, martial arts exhibitions, and attendance by Buddhist nuns from the City of Ten Thousand Buddhas as well as local politicians. It received the National Preservation Honor Award of the National Trust for Historic Preservation in 2002.

== Activity ==
The Temple of Kwan Tai is one of the oldest Chinese temples in California that has been used continuously since its construction. Other 1850s-era Chinese temples in California include the Weaverville Joss House, the Auburn Joss House, San Francisco's Tin How Temple, and the Bok Kai Temple in Marysville.

The temple is used for traditional Chinese rituals in which the officiant kneels and bows at the altar, placing offerings at the table in front of the altar or burning them in the furnace. Offerings of food are made on the first and 15th day of each lunar month and at the new moon, and incense is burned daily. Additionally, the temple may be used for divination by kau cim sticks and jiaobei blocks.

As well as continuing to serve as a house of worship, the temple has a mission of educating members of the Mendocino community and visitors about Chinese contributions to California history.

== See also ==
- Bok Kai Temple (北溪廟) located in the city of Marysville, California
- Kong Chow Temple (岡州古廟) located in San Francisco, California
- Oroville Chinese Temple (列聖宮) located in Oroville, California
- Taoist Temple located in Hanford, California
- Tin How Temple (天后古廟) in San Francisco's Chinatown, California
- Weaverville Joss House (雲林廟), located in the center of the town of Weaverville, California
