= Bok Kai Temple =

- Bok Kai Temple (Chinese: 北溪廟)
- U.S. National Register of Historic Places
- California Historical Landmark No. 889
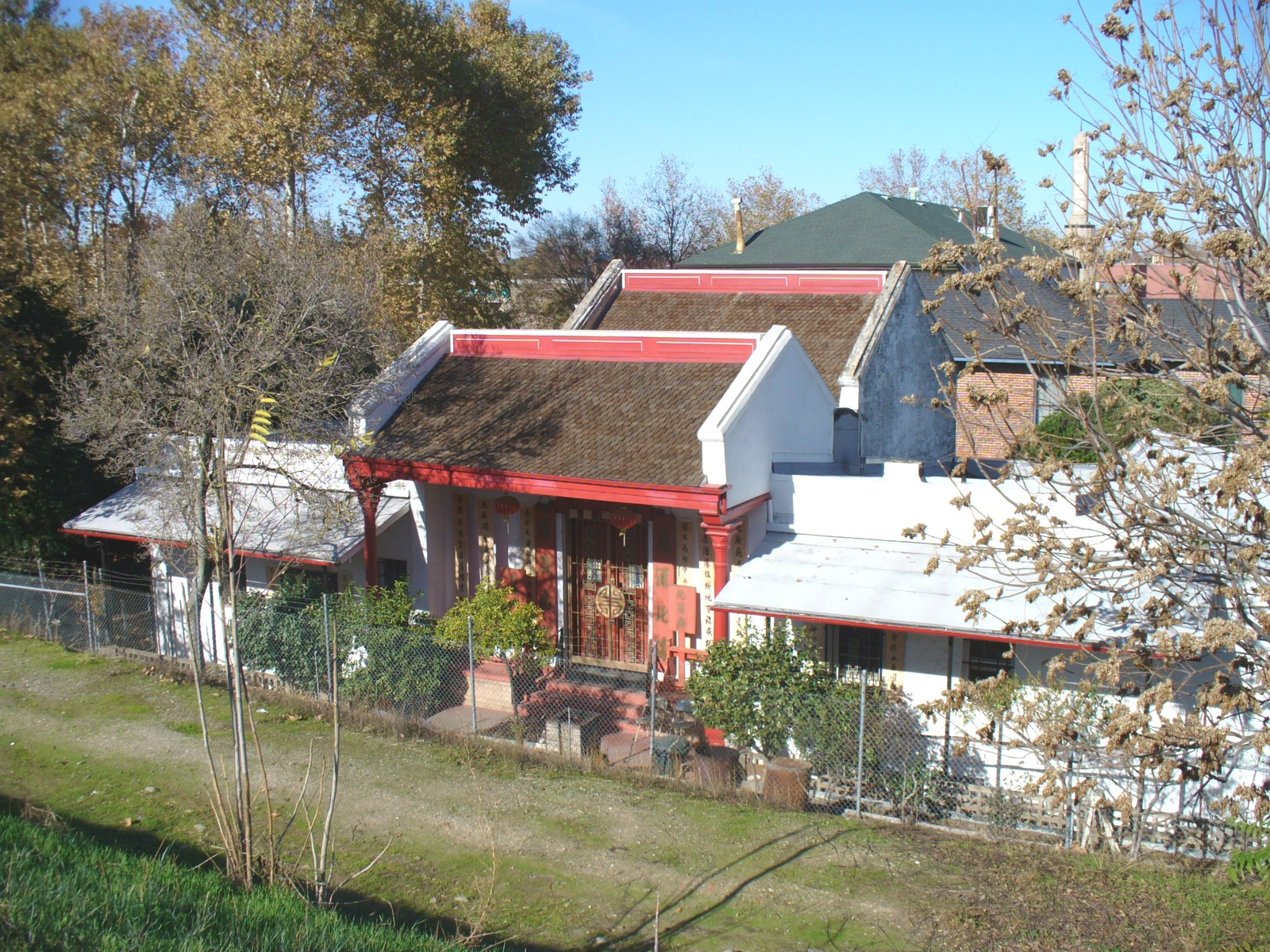
- Full view of the Bok Kai Temple

- Location within California Location within the United States
- Location: Marysville, California
- Coordinates: 39°8′5.98″N 121°35′13.03″W
- Built: 1880
- NRHP reference No.: 75000498
- CHISL No.: 889

Significant dates
- Added to NRHP: May 21, 1975
- Designated CHISL: 1975

The Bok Kai Temple (Chinese: 北溪廟, literally North Creek Temple) is a traditional Chinese temple in the city of Marysville, California, located at the corner of D and First Streets. Since 1880, it served as the center of what was a bustling Chinatown for a small town known as the "Gateway to the Gold Fields". It is the only in situ 19th-century Chinese Temple in the United States that is still active.

== History ==
When the Chinese from the Pearl River Delta west of Canton arrived in California during the gold rush, many on their way to work the gold mines landed in riverboats at Marysville. Its importance as a supply depot grew and was imprinted in their Cantonese language: Marysville was known as Sahm Fou (三埠, Third City); Sacramento Yee Fou (二埠, Second City); and San Francisco Dai Fou (大埠, The Big City).

In the 1860s, a temple was erected in Marysville to serve its substantial Chinese population. The history of the original and other non-extant temples is unclear; but in 1880 a new one was built and dedicated, which is still in place and in use. The foremost of the gods that are worshiped is Běidì (北帝; 'North Deity', Cantonese: Pak Tai, Bok Tai; non-standard Toishanese: Buck Eye, Beuk Aie), also known as Xuan Wu, (玄武 "Dark Warrior" or "Mysterious Warrior"), a Deity in Chinese folk religion believed to govern the northern region and rain, hence its place of reverence at Bok Kai Temple, or Northern Creek Temple.

The temple plays a central role for the "bomb festival"; the first such festival in Marysville dates back to at least 1873, before the current temple was built. Although a dozen Chinese communities in California held "bomb festivals" in the late 19th century, usually on yee yuet yee (Chinese: 二月二; lit. 'second-month second'), the second day of the second month of the lunar year, Marysville's festival is the only one to persist to the present day. Each "bomb" used is a specially made firecracker that launches a hand-sized "good fortune" ring with a number (the local newspaper called them "wheels of fortune") high in the air above the assembled crowd. The lucky person who catches the ring as it drops, fights off others vying for it, and retains full control of it, usually to the temple door, receives from the temple a reward or fortune corresponding to the ring number. In the 1880s, the Marysville dragon, Moo Lung (Chinese: 舞龍; lit. 'dragon dance'), was added to the festivities. In the 1950s, when Marysville was the only U.S. community firing off these "bombs", the name was changed to the Bok Kai Festival.

The temple remains a primary focus of the present Marysville Chinese-American community, who have dedicated themselves to preserving the temple and celebrating the Bok Kai Festival.

== Current use ==
The temple is infrequently used as an active place of worship, but is preserved as both a California Historical Landmark and as a protected property on the National Register of Historic Places. A Bok Kai festival and parade is held annually in the spring, during which time the temple is opened for ceremonies as well as for interested parties to tour. Other tours may be arranged by contacting the Temple caretaker.

In 2022, it was reported that the temple served as an inspiration and point of reference for artists working on the Pixar film Turning Red, which features a fictional temple located in Chinatown, Toronto.

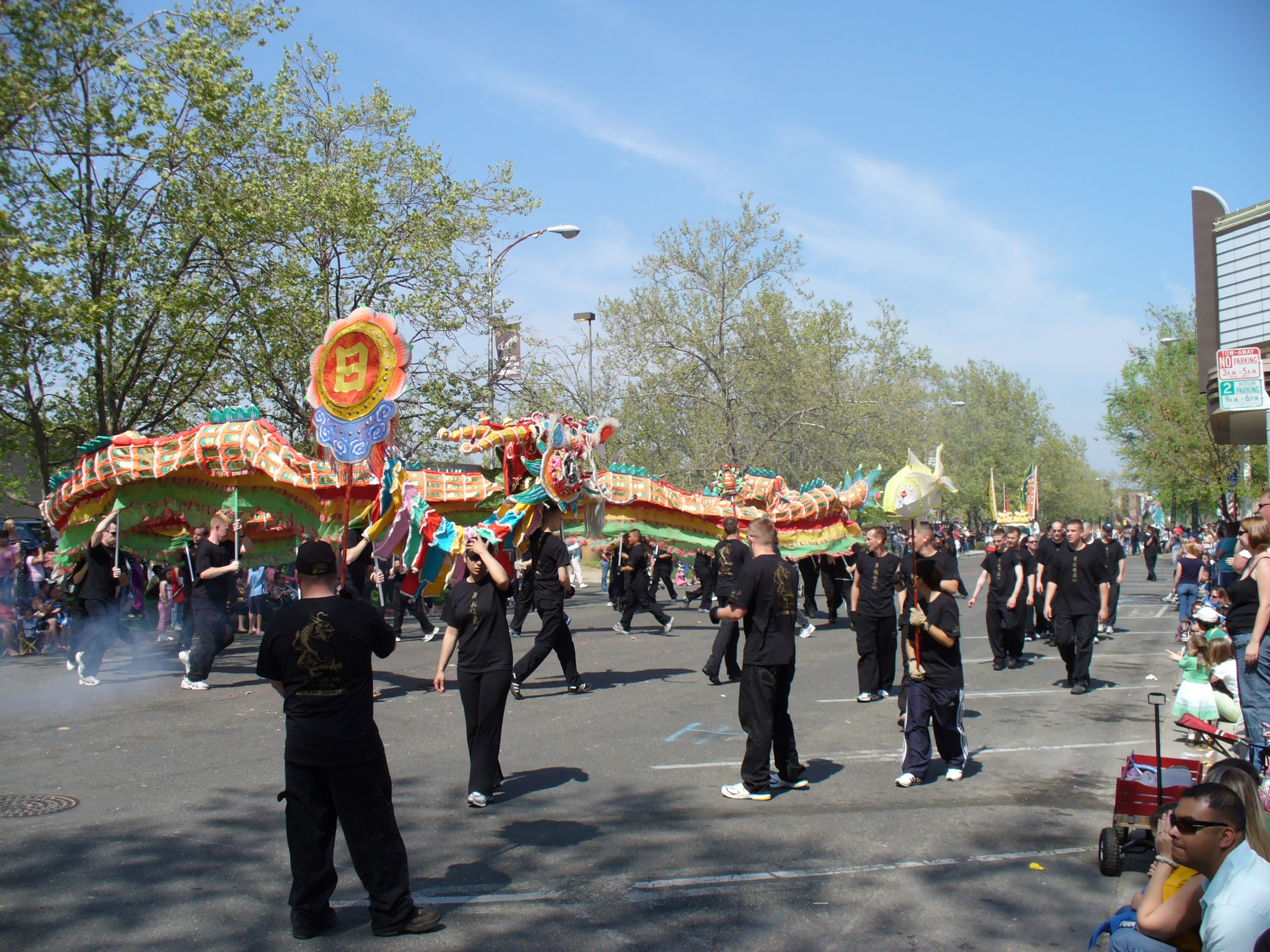
The dragon in the parade at the annual Bok Kai festival

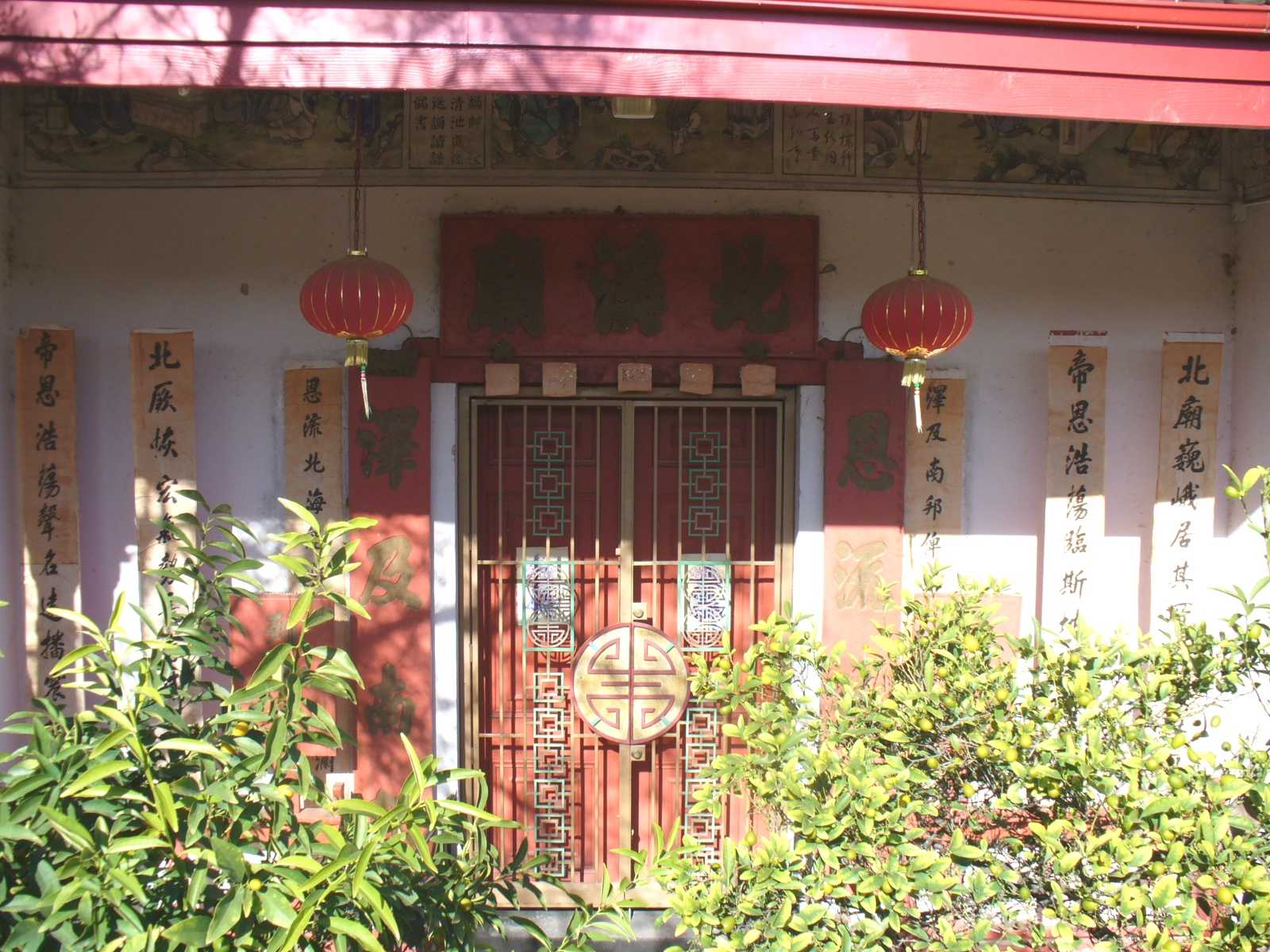
The front view of the Bok Kai Temple

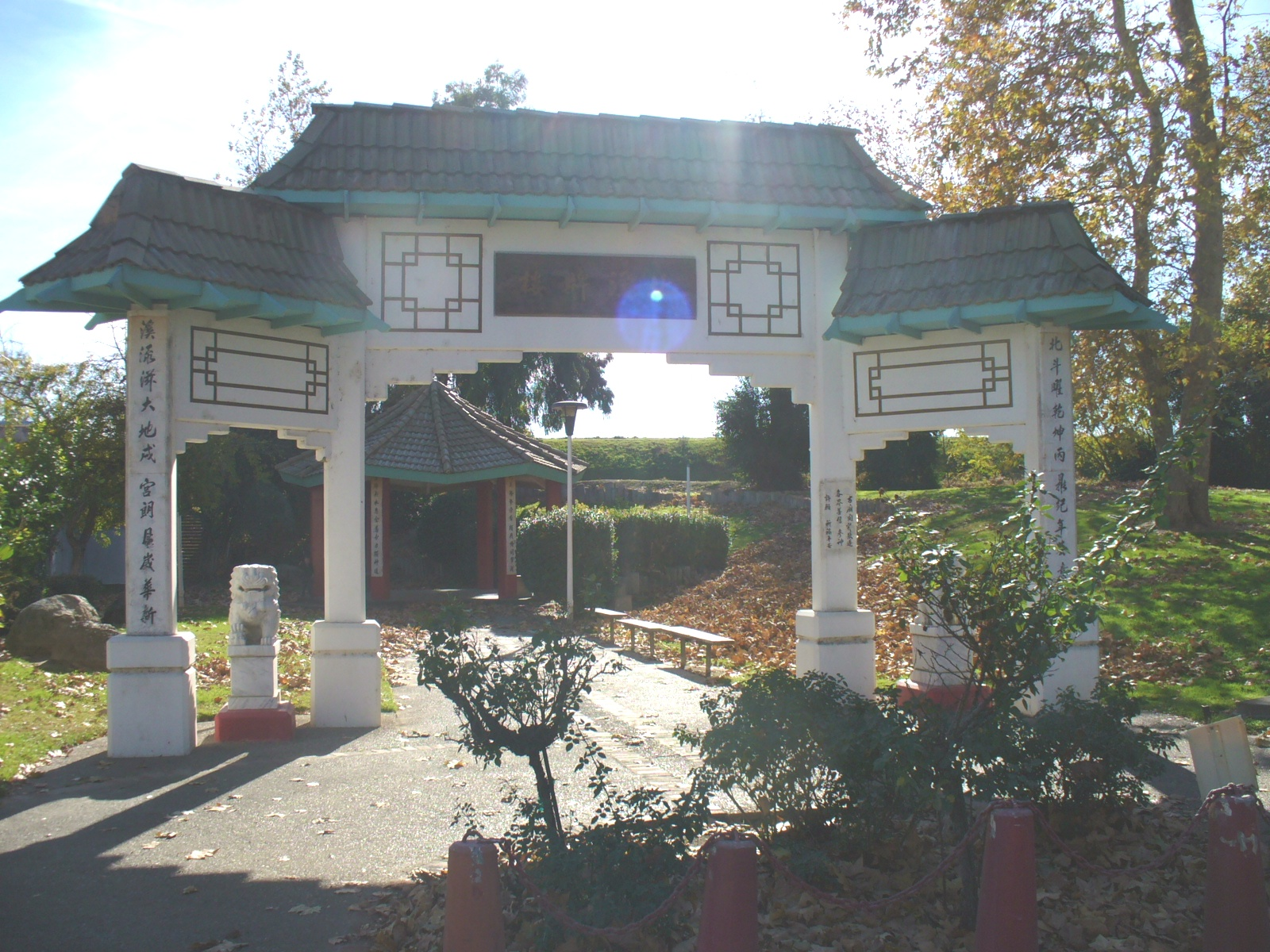
The gate of the Bok Kai Temple from the street

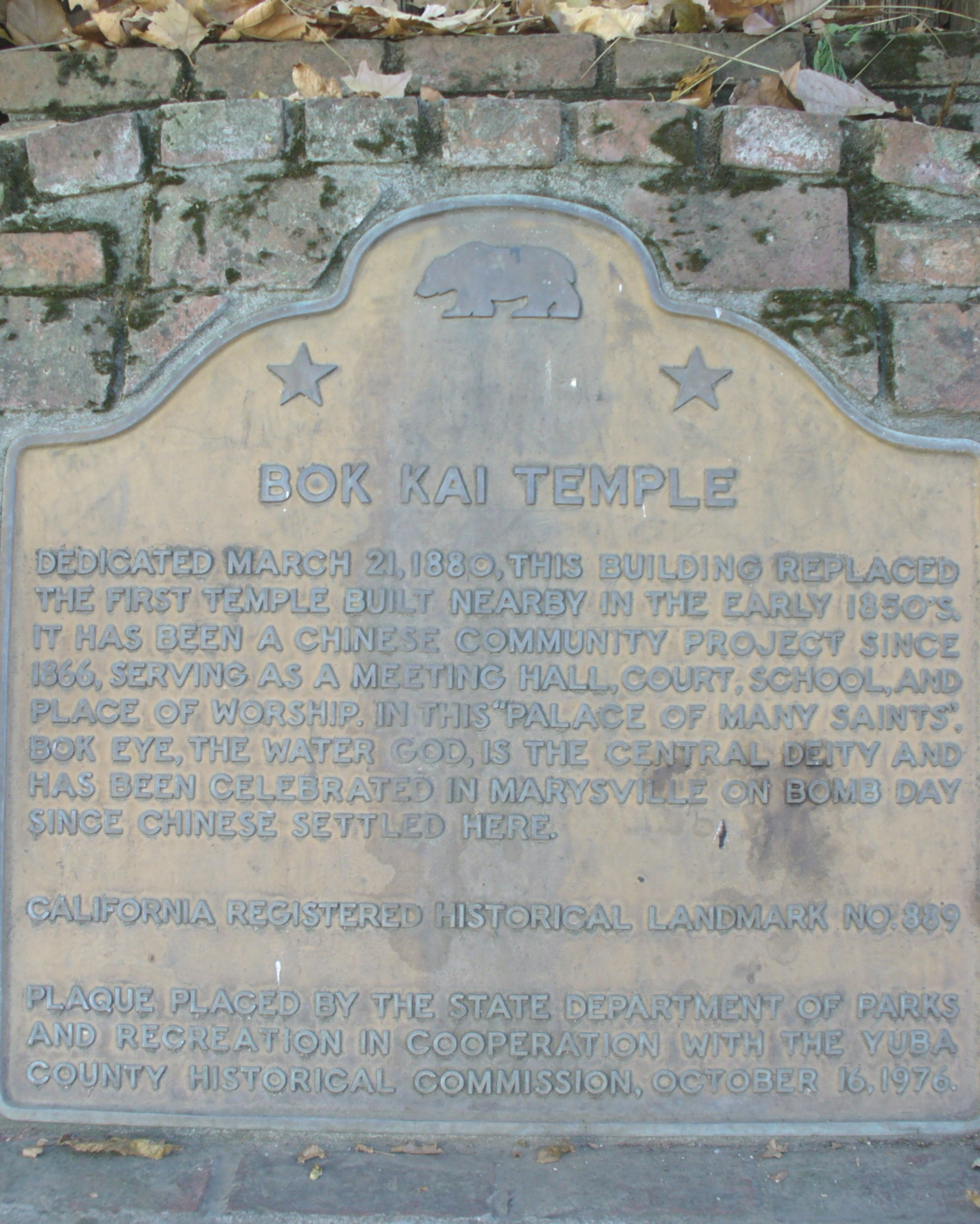
Bok Kai Temple historical marker plaque

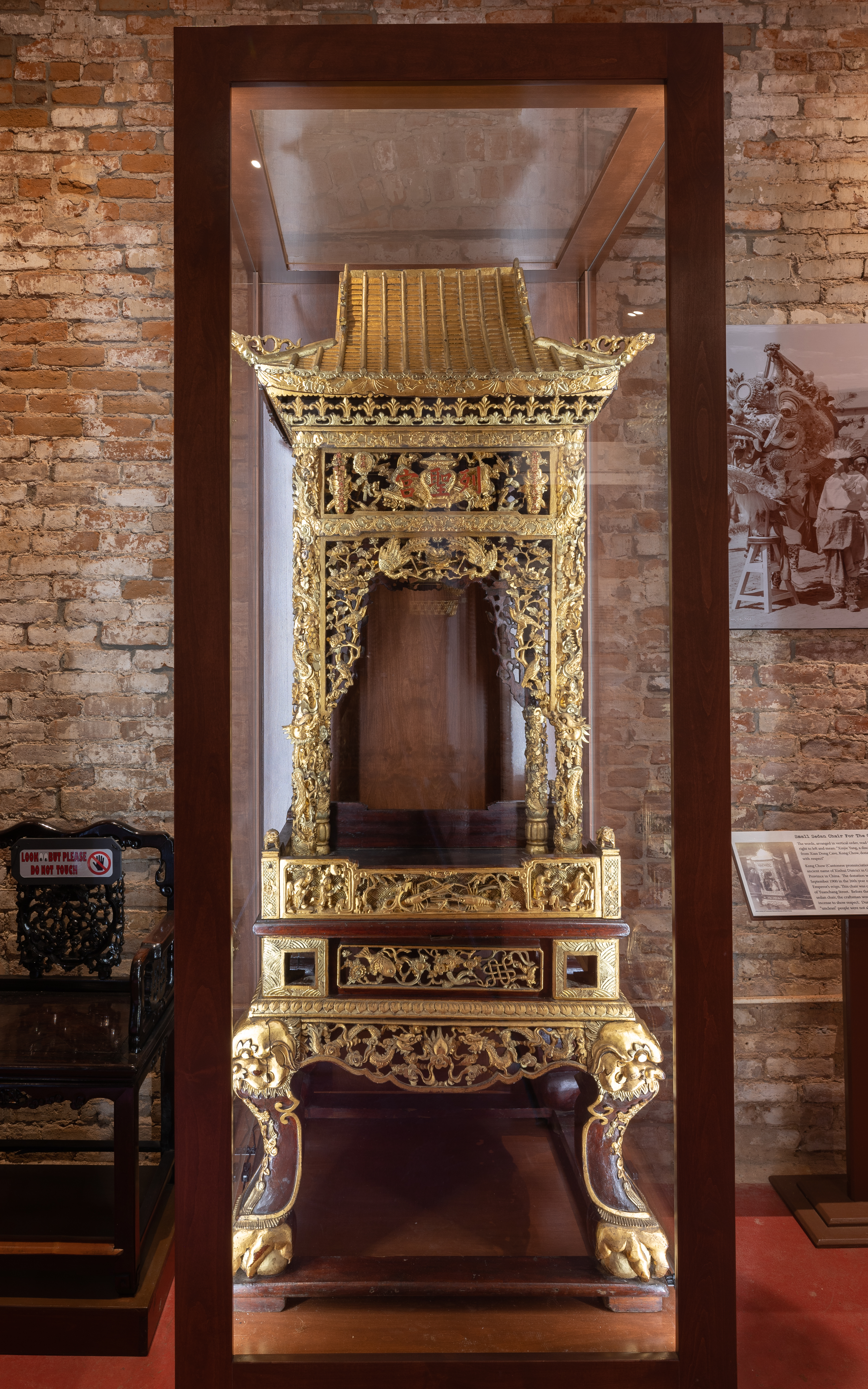
Small sedan chair for the Gods

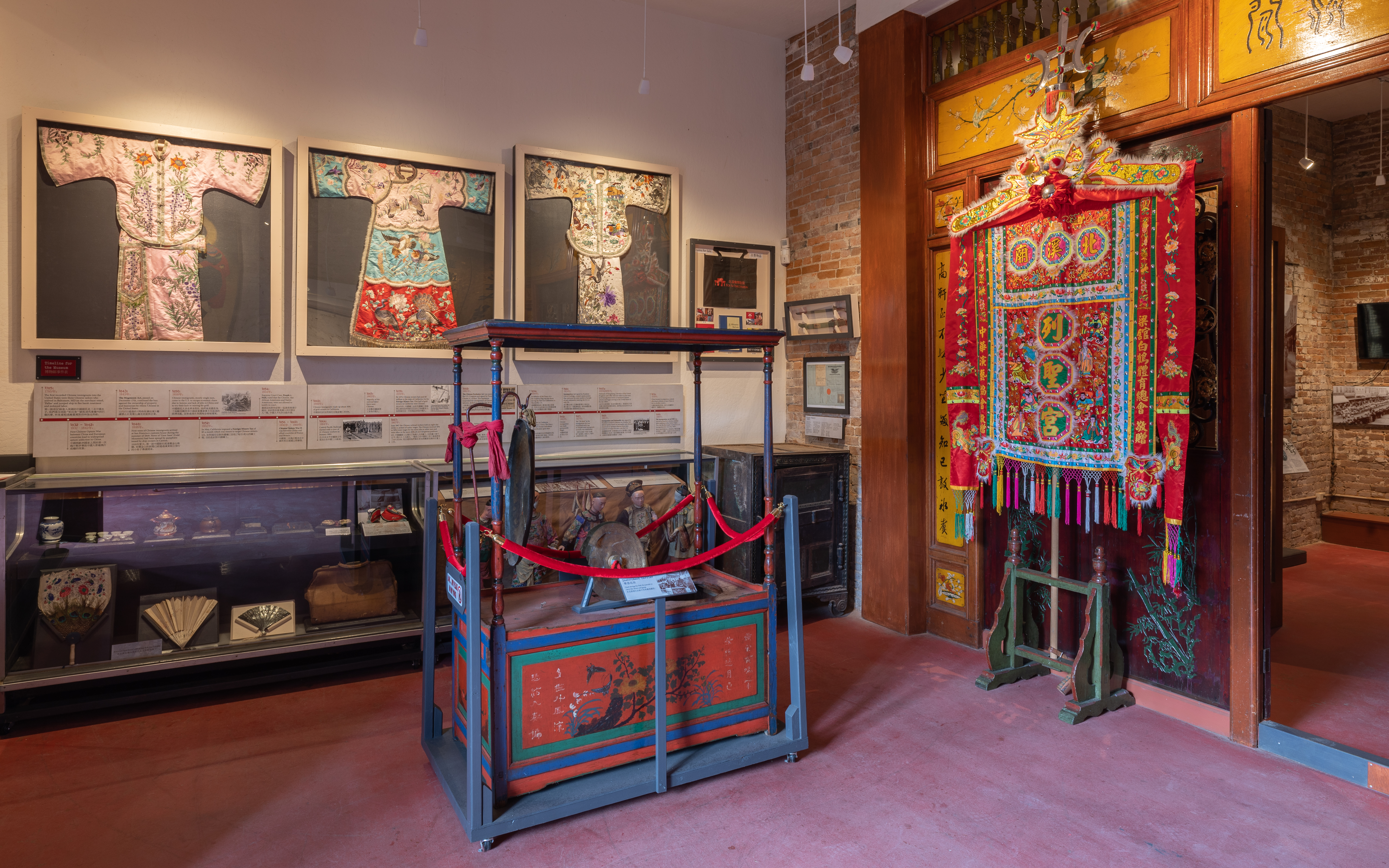
Exhibition

== See also ==
- Temple of Kwan Tai (武帝廟) located in Mendocino, California
- Kong Chow Temple (岡州古廟) located in San Francisco, California
- Tin How Temple (天后古廟) in San Francisco's Chinatown, California
- Oroville Chinese Temple (列聖宮) located in Oroville, California
- Taoist Temple located in Hanford, California
- Weaverville Joss House (雲林廟), located in the center of the town of Weaverville, California
