= Old Auburn Historic District =

Historic district in California, US

- U.S. National Register of Historic Places
- U.S. Historic district
- California Historical Landmark
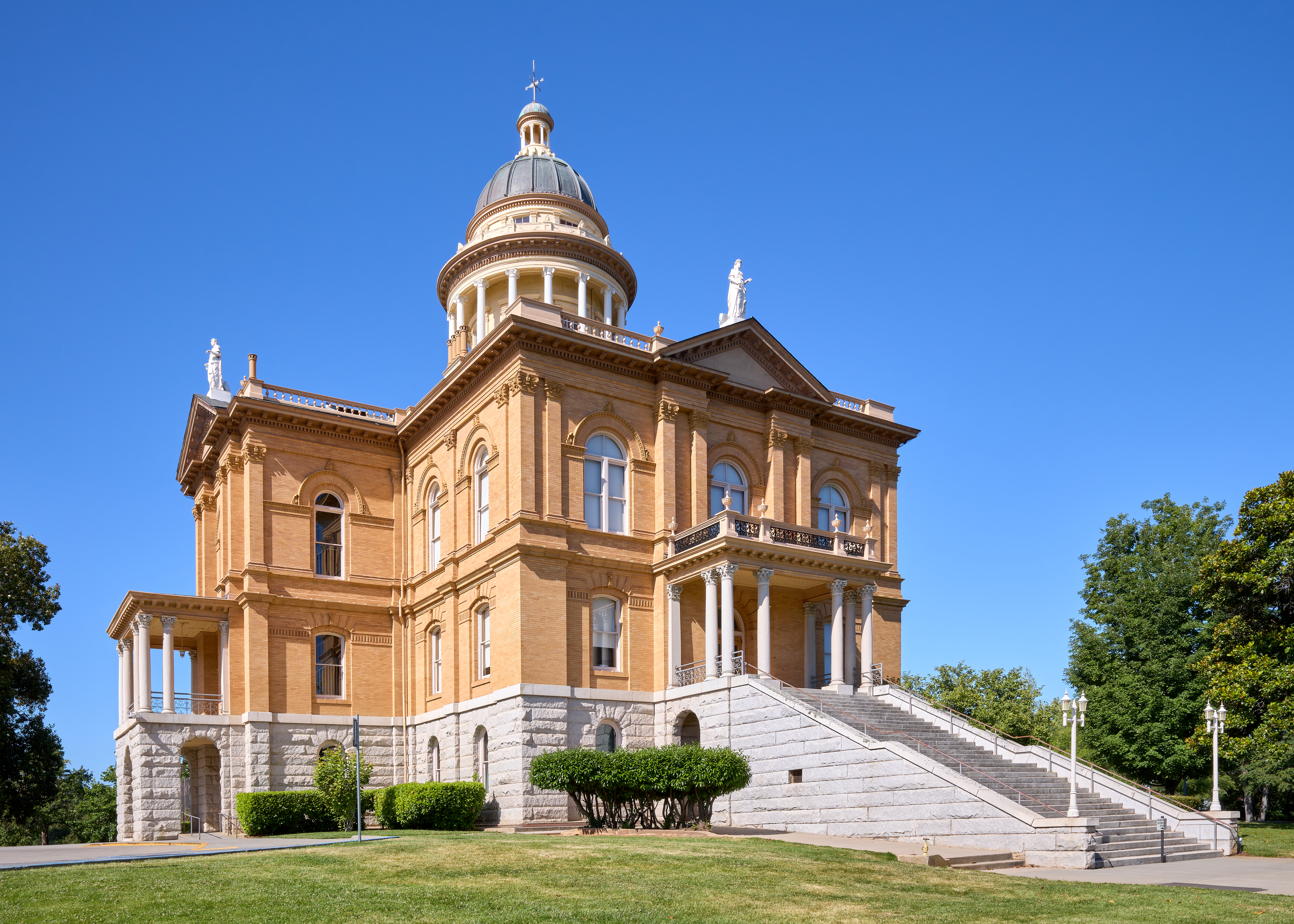
- Auburn California courthouse (1897)

- Location within California
- Location: Roughly bounded by Maple, Commercial, Court, Washington, Spring, and Sacramento Streets, Auburn, California, United States
- Coordinates: 38.894167°N 121.076111°W
- Area: 22 acres (8.9 ha)
- Built: 1855
- NRHP reference No.: 70000138
- CHISL No.: N62

Significant dates
- Added to NRHP: December 29, 1970
- Designated CHISL: December 29, 1970

The Old Auburn Historic District is a historic district in Auburn, California, United States. It is listed as one of the National Register of Historic Places since December 29, 1970. It is also known as North Fork Dry Diggings, and Woods Dry Diggings.

== History ==
The Old Auburn Historic District was the center of commerce during the early California Gold Rush era, with its close proximity to the Gold Country Mother lode. It was one of the earliest mining camps in the state. On April 25, 1851, the city of Auburn was declared the County Seat of Placer County. In the early 1900s, the city became the largest plum producer in the nation, and had a large agricultural industry.

== Notable buildings ==
- Placer County Courthouse (or Historic Auburn Courthouse, built 1897), 101 Maple Street
- Travellers' Rest and Winery (or Travelers’ Rest Stage Roadhouse, blacksmith shop built c. 1860, and winery c. 1870), 291 Auburn-Folsom Road
- Lawyers Row (built 1855), 299 Commercial Street
- Commercial Street buildings (built 1850s)
- Auburn Joss House (or Chinese Joss House; building built 1930, and shrine built 1860s), 200 Sacramento Street

== See also ==
- National Register of Historic Places listings in Placer County, California
