= Imperial Dynasty (restaurant) =

Restaurant in California

Coordinates: 36.333273°N 119.646889°W

- Interactive map of Imperial Dynasty

Restaurant information
- Established: 1883
- Closed: 2006
- Location: Hanford, California, U.S.

The Imperial Dynasty restaurant was a gourmet restaurant in Hanford, California. The restaurant was founded in 1883 in Hanford's Chinatown, and was run by the same family for four generations, having started as a simple noodle house in the 19th century.

Richard Wing combined French and Chinese cooking in the 1960s to create one of the first fusion cuisines. The restaurant closed in early 2006 due to the declining health of the owner, who died in 2010 at the age of 89.

== China Alley ==
China Alley, where the restaurant was located, was listed as one of the 11 most endangered historic places in America in 2011 by the National Trust for Historic Preservation.

== See also ==
- List of Chinese restaurants
- List of defunct restaurants of the United States
- Taoist Temple (Hanford, California)
