= Auburn Joss House =

Historic building in California, US

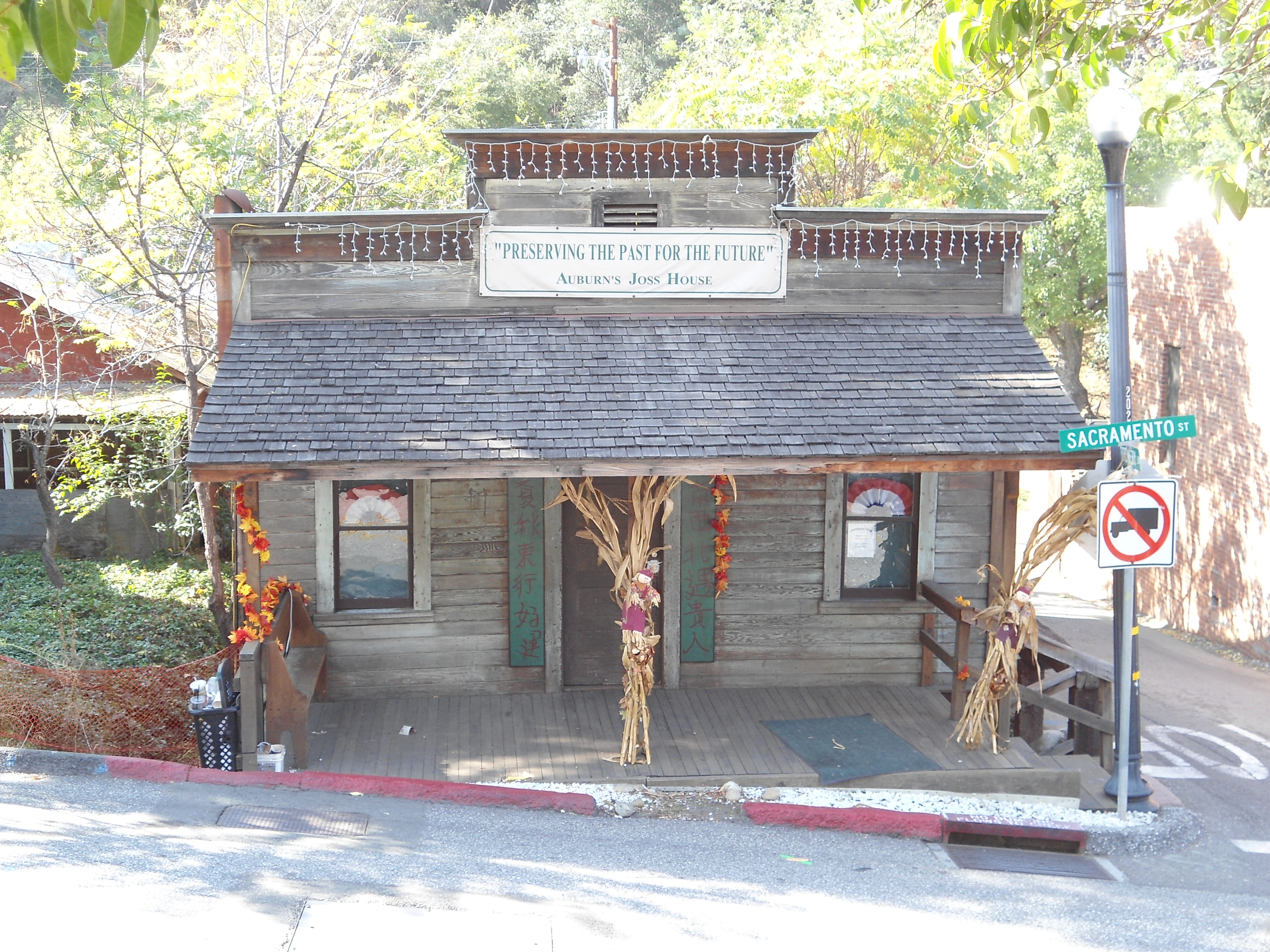

- Location within California Location within the United States
- 38.894787°N 121.078208°W
- Location: 200 Sacramento Street, Auburn, California, United States

History
- Built: 1909
- Demolished: August 25, 1921 (fire)
- Rebuilt: 1930

Site notes
- Governing body: State of California

The Auburn Joss House is a historic Chinese community building in Auburn, California, United States. It now serves as a cultural history museum, which is open to the public with limited hours. The Auburn Joss House is part of the Old Auburn Historic District, a National Register of Historic Place listed historic district; and has a historical marker erected in 2005 by the Native Sons of the Golden West. It is also known as Joss House and Joss House Museum.

== History ==
An old name in English for Chinese traditional temples is "joss house", an Anglicized spelling of deus, the Portuguese word for "god". The building was originally built for social and religious purposes in 1909 in the city of Auburn's Chinatown. It was the meeting place of the Ling Ying Association, as well as used as a Chinese school, and boarding house.

After a fire in August 25, 1921, the current version of the building was completed in 1930 by Charles Jung Yue and his brothers. The interior of the building contains an 1860s Taoist altar, which was built shortly after the California Gold Rush.

== See also ==
- National Register of Historic Places listings in Placer County, California
- Bok Kai Temple
- Temple of Kwan Tai
- Weaverville Joss House State Historic Park
