= Bernhard Museum Complex =

- Location within California
- Location: Auburn, California
- Coordinates: 38.891642°N 121.075591°W
- Type: History museum
- Website: Official website

The Bernhard Museum Complex is a history museum located in Auburn, California, United States. It consists of one of the oldest buildings in Placer County, Traveler's Rest, which was built in 1851 as a hotel. The Bernhard Museum Complex is part of the Old Auburn Historic District, a National Register of Historic Place listed historic district. It is also known as the Bernhard Museum, and Travellers' Rest and Winery.

== History ==
The complex includes the historic building, Traveler's Rest, which was built in 1851. The hotel was popular with miners and those traveling along Auburn Folsom Road. In 1858 it became a home. In 1868 it was bought by German immigrant Benjamin Bernhard, who moved to America in 1846. The property became a winery in 1874, with the addition of a winery building and an additional building for processing in 1881.

== Museum ==
Today, the museum features the restored winery and processing building, and the home which is decorated in the Victorian period style. Costumed interpreters give tours of the site. There is also a carriage barn which was built by the Native Sons of the Golden West. It houses a collection of wagons, including a buggy and a mud wagon. In 2007, the Placer County Museums Living History Program built a summer kitchen.

== Collection ==
The museum includes objects from everyday Victorian life, wagons, and objects related to the 19th century winemaking.
