= Tin How Temple =

Taoist temple in San Francisco's Chinatown

Coordinates: 37°47′40″N 122°24′26″W

- 天后古廟
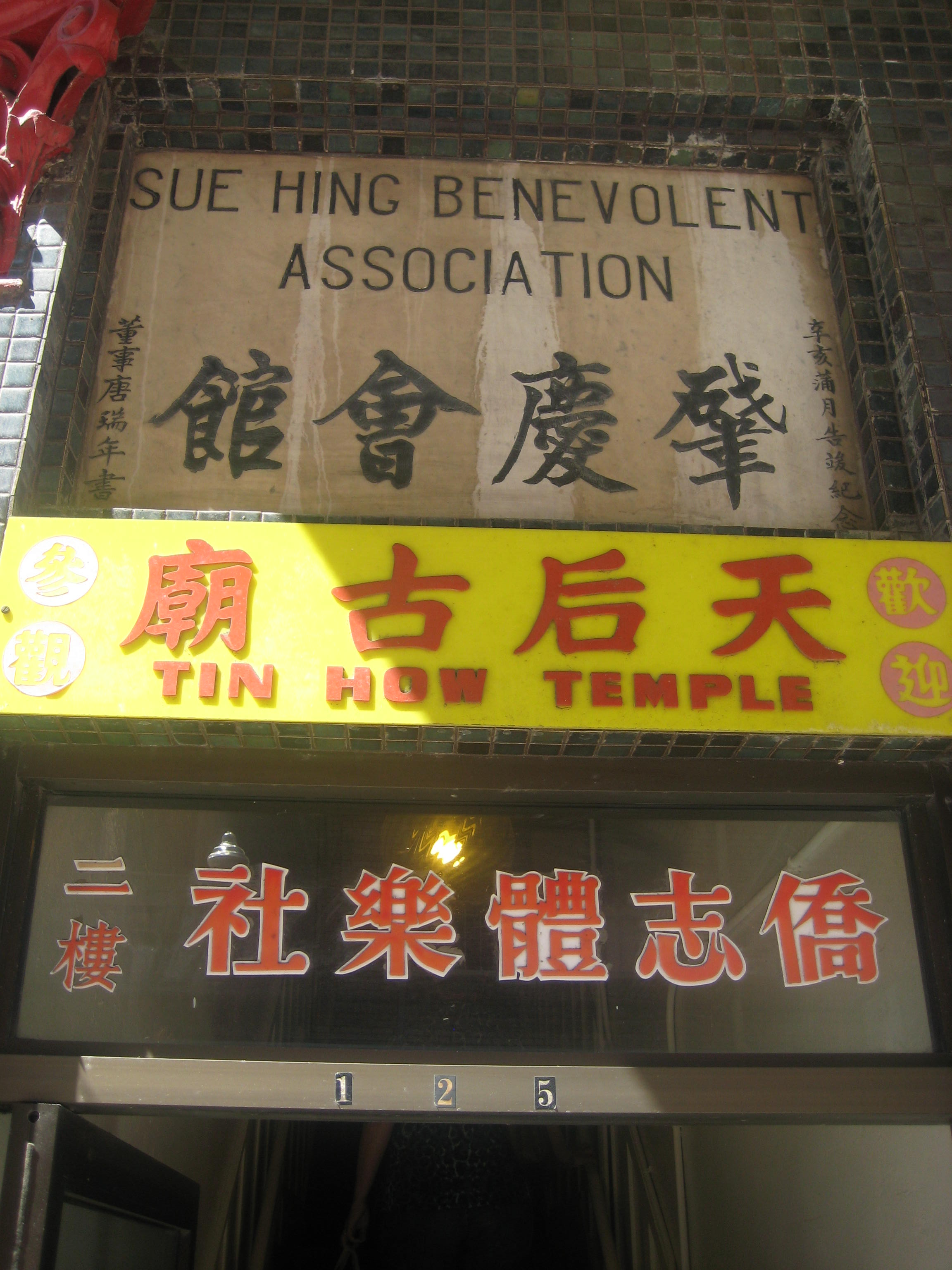
- Entrance to Tin How Temple at 125 Waverly Place in San Francisco's Chinatown

- Location within San Francisco Location within San Francisco Bay Area

Religion
- Affiliation: Taoism
- District: Chinatown

Location
- Location: 125 Waverly Pl
- Municipality: San Francisco
- State: California
- Country: United States
- Interactive map of Tin How Temple

The Tin How Temple (also spelled Tianhou Temple, simplified Chinese: 天后古庙; traditional Chinese: 天后古廟; pinyin: Tiānhòu gǔ miào) is the oldest extant Taoist temple in San Francisco's Chinatown, and one of the oldest still-operating Chinese temples in the United States. It is dedicated to the Chinese sea goddess Mazu, who is known as Tin How (天后, Empress of Heavens) in Cantonese.

== History ==
Many people from China began immigrating to the United States, particularly California, during the California gold rush for various reasons. When arriving in they built temples, including the Tim How Temple, the Weaverville Joss House State Historic Park, the Temple of Kwan Tai in Mendocino, California, among others.

The temple was purportedly founded in roughly 1852 or 1853, reportedly at its current location by Day Ju, one of the first Chinese people to arrive in San Francisco. The building was later destroyed in the 1906 earthquake and fire, with the image of the goddess, the temple bell, and part of the altar surviving. By then, ownership of the building site had transitioned to the Sue Hing Benevolent Association, which reopened it in 1910 on the top floor of a four-story building it built on the site. The temple closed in 1955 and reopened on May 4, 1975, after the Immigration and Nationality Act of 1965 had caused a rejuvenation of San Francisco's Chinatown.

In May 2010, the one-hundredth anniversary of the temple was celebrated by a religious procession through the streets in the neighborhood, including dances and fireworks. The temple is a significant landmark in Chinatown; the Chinese name for Waverly Place is 天后庙街; 天后廟街; Tiānhòu miào jiē; 'Tin How Temple Street'.

== Visiting ==
The temple is open daily between 10:00 A.M. and 3:00 P.M., excepting holidays. Admission is free with permission from the attendant, and donations are accepted. Photography is not allowed inside the temple.

== See also ==
Although both temples are dedicated to Mazu, the Tin How Temple is not to be confused with the "Ma-Tsu Temple of U.S.A." two blocks north of it, which was founded in 1986 with affiliation to the Chaotian Temple in Taiwan. There is also another temple that is dedicated to Mazu in Los Angeles's Chinatown which is known as Thien Hau Temple, primarily catering to the Chinese Vietnamese population.

=== Other notable Chinese temples ===
- Temple of Kwan Tai (武帝廟) located in Mendocino, California
- Bok Kai Temple (北溪廟) located in the city of Marysville, California
- Kong Chow Temple (岡州古廟) located in San Francisco, California
- Weaverville Joss House (雲林廟), located in the center of the town of Weaverville, California

== Gallery ==
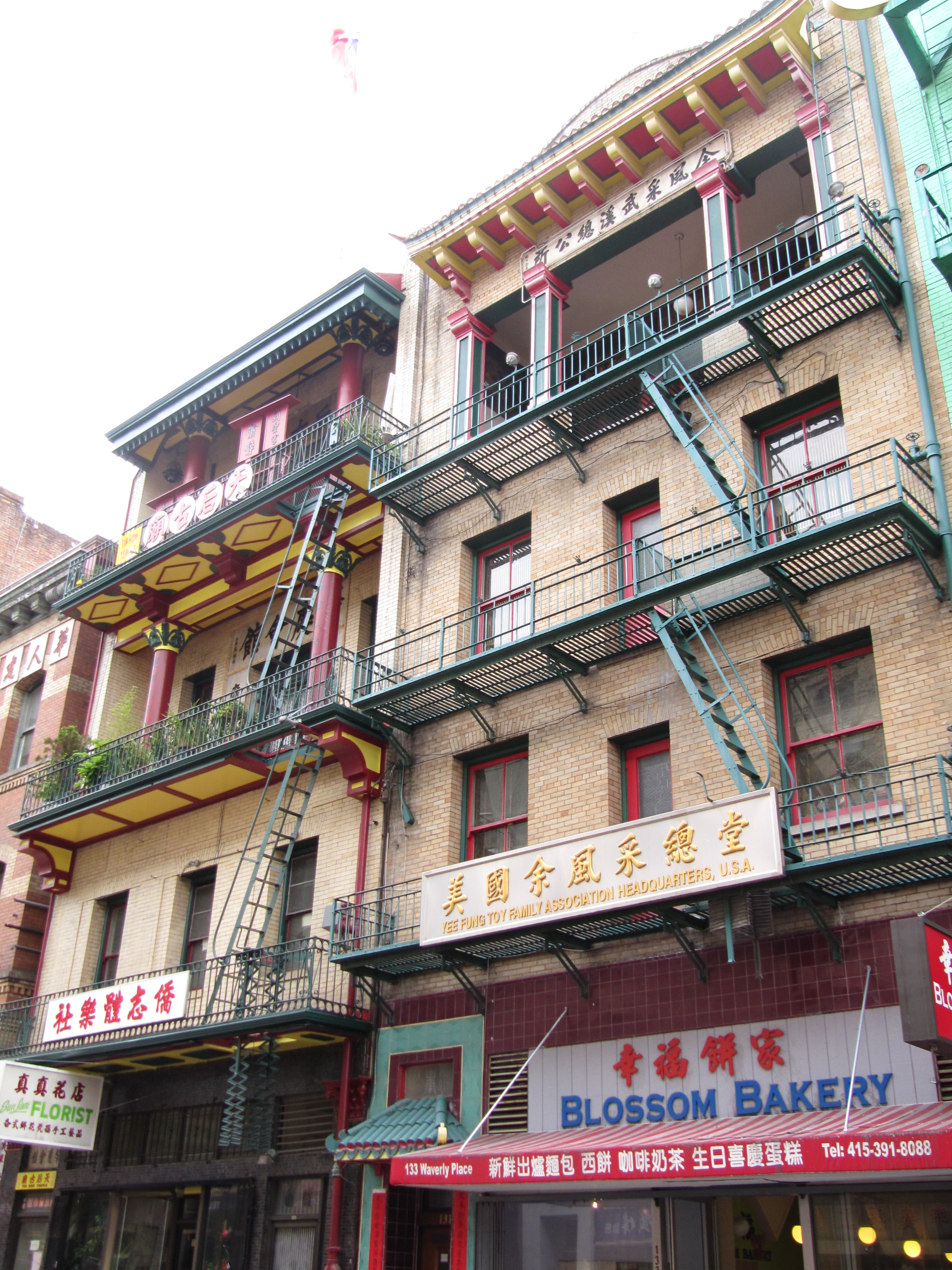
Tin How Temple (left building, top floor)

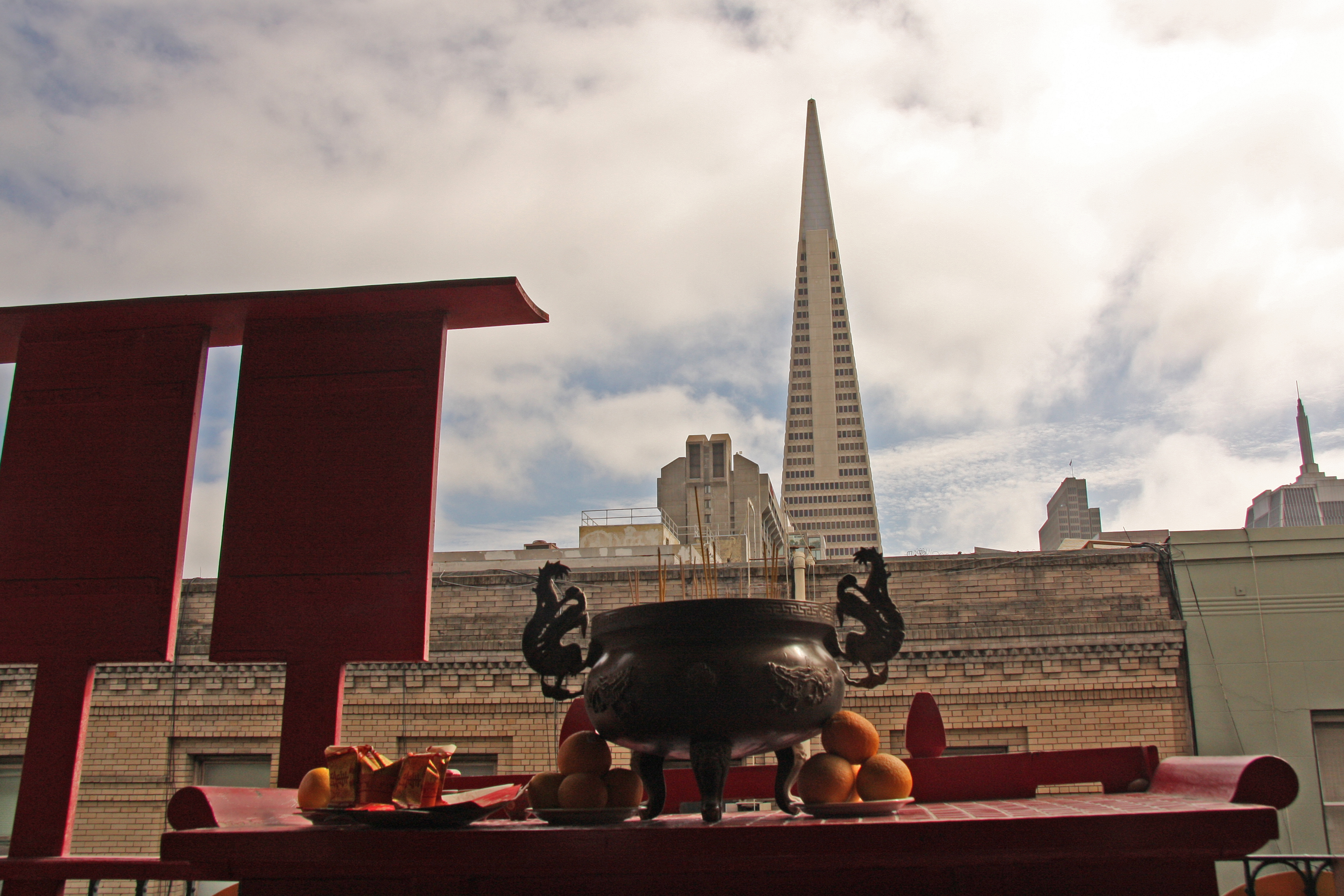
View of Transamerica Pyramid, Embarcadero Center, and Hilton San Francisco Financial District from temple balcony

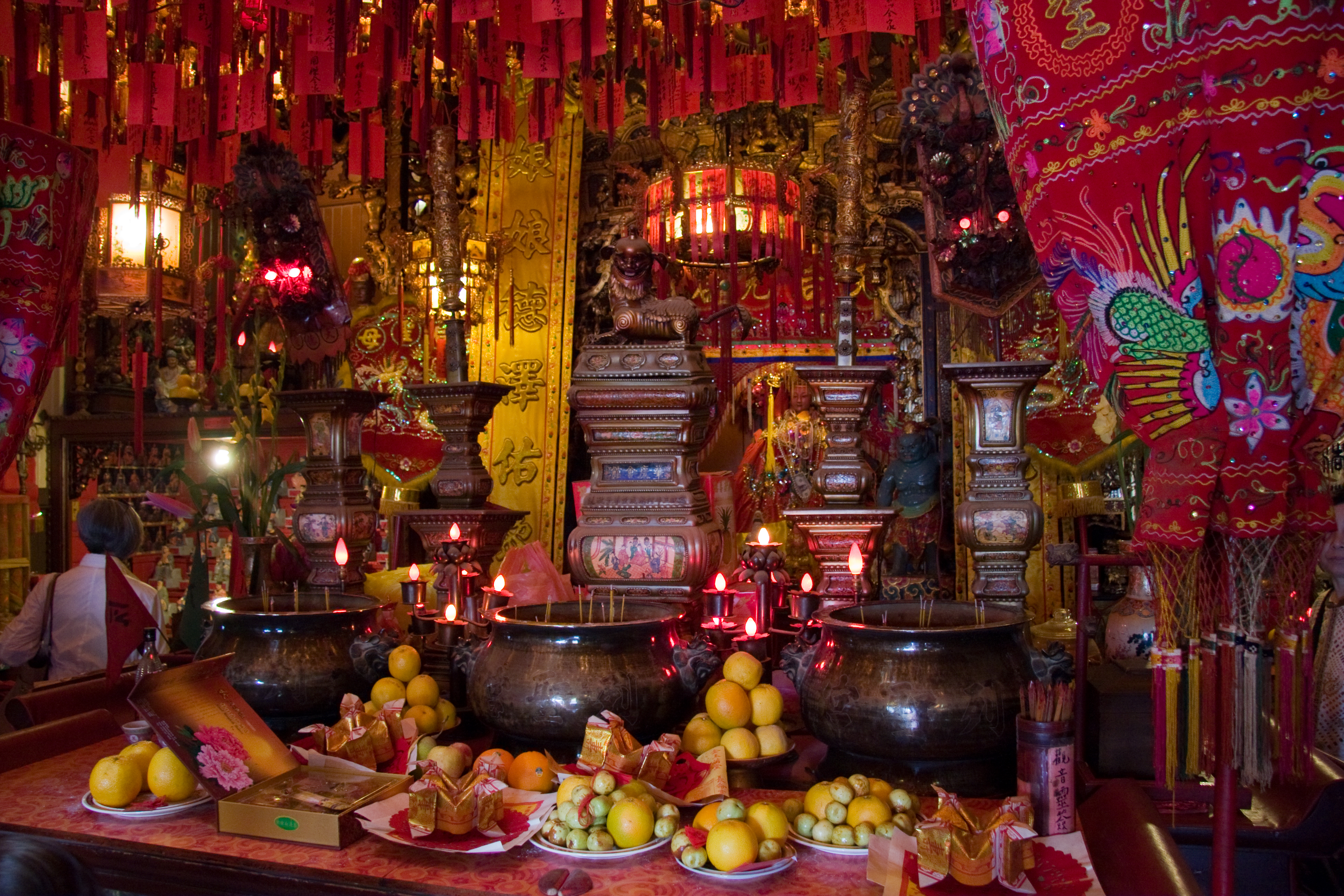
Jingxiang temple altar

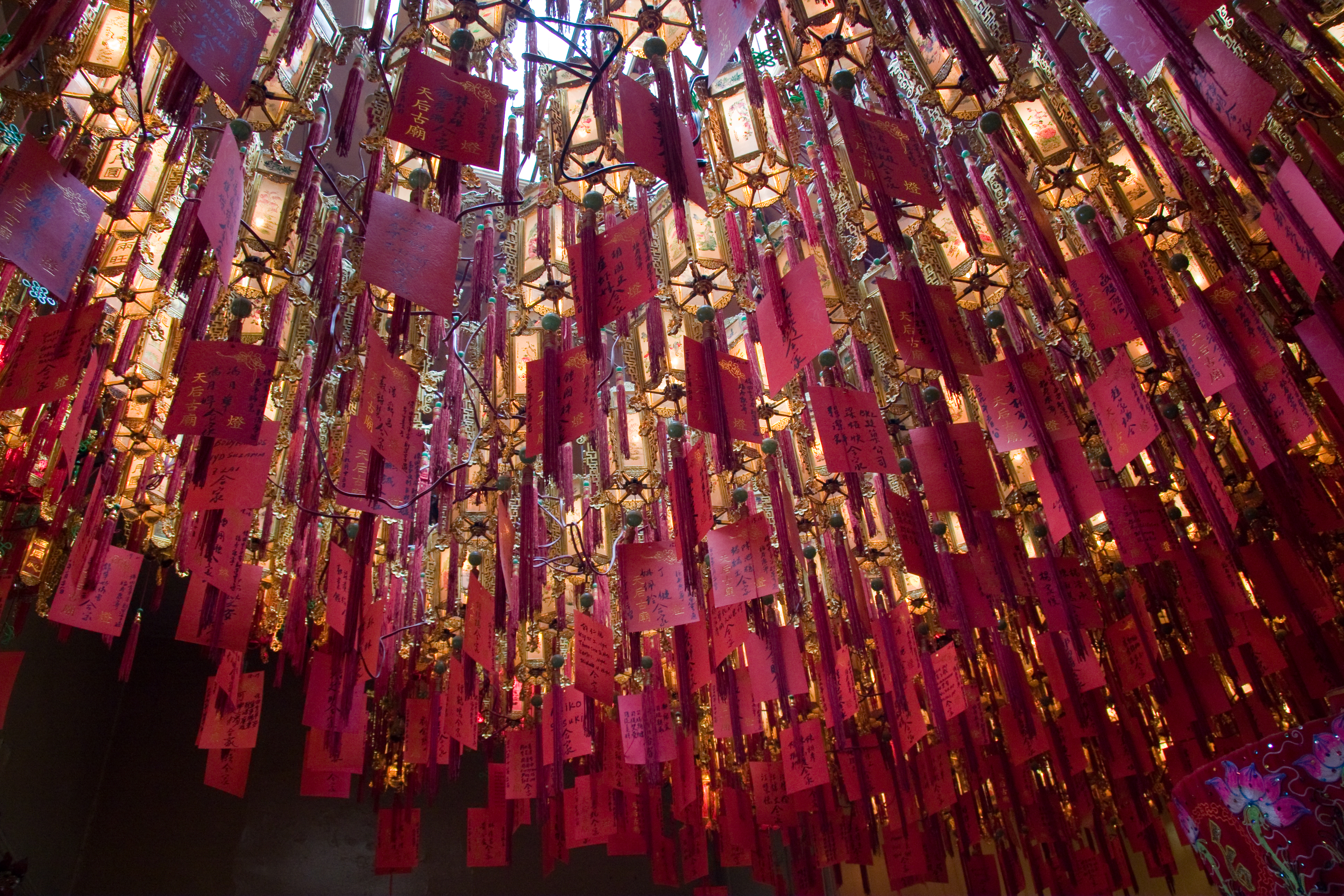
Devotee lanterns; donor names are written on red paper and attached to the lanterns
