= Ma-Tsu Temple (San Francisco) =

Ma-Tsu Temple of U.S.A.
- 美國舊金山媽祖廟朝聖宮
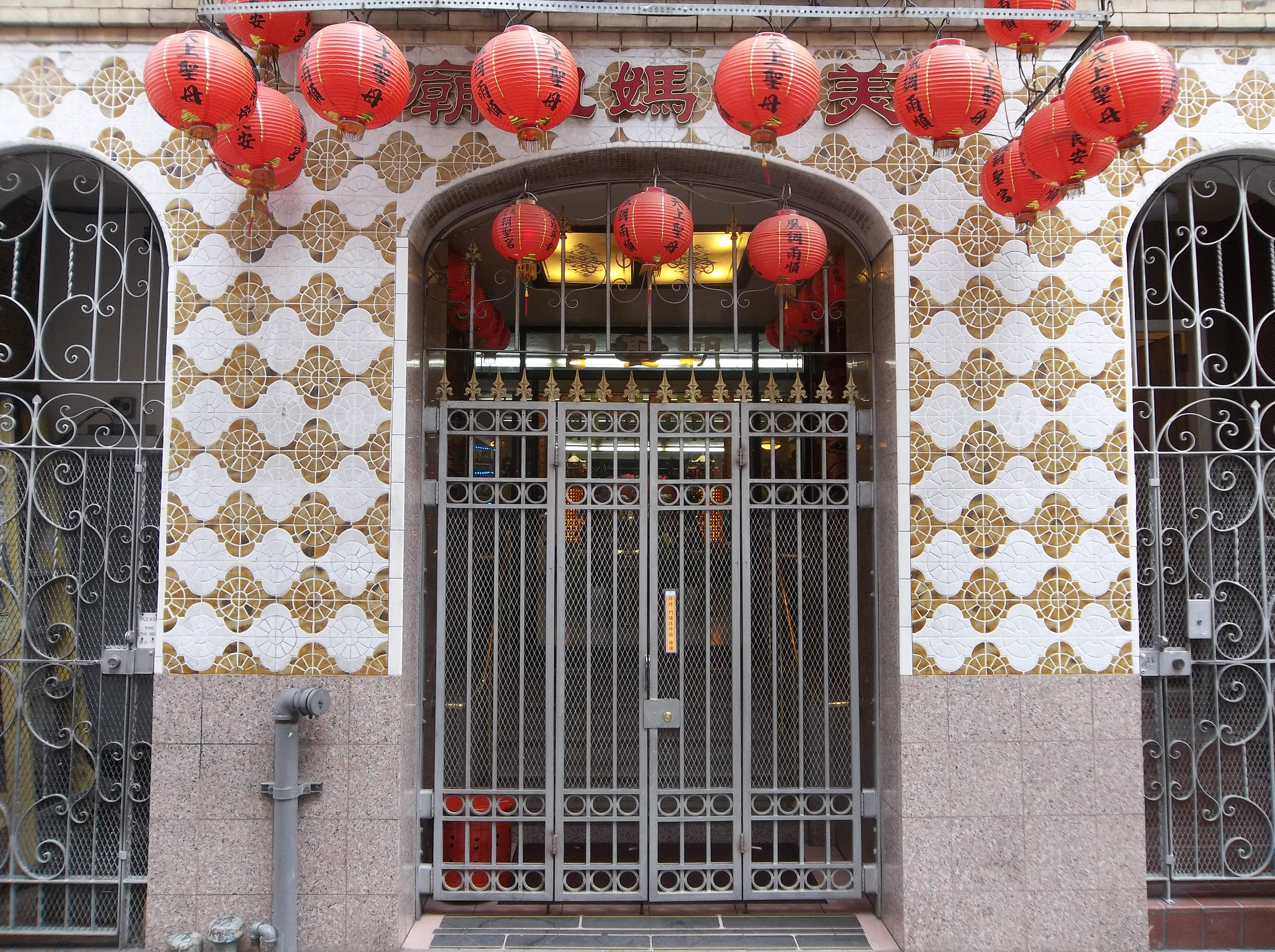
- Temple entrance gate
- Interactive map of Ma-Tsu Temple of U.S.A.

Monastery information
- Full name: Ma-Tsu Temple of U.S.A.
- Order: Taoism
- Established: 1986

Site
- Location: 30 Beckett Street; San Francisco, California; 94133; United States of America
- Coordinates: 37.7965°N 122.4064°W
- Website: www.matsutempleusa.org

The Ma-Tsu Temple is a Taoist temple in San Francisco's Chinatown. Founded in 1986, it is dedicated to Matsu and has foundational ties to the Chaotian Temple in Beigang, Yunlin, Taiwan.

Its founding has been described as reflective of both a change in Chinese American demographics following the Immigration and Nationality Act of 1965 and the rise of a transnational Taiwanese-American community economically enabled by the Taiwan Miracle of the 1980s.

The temple was originally located on Grant Avenue before moving to its present location on Becket Street in 1996. It is not to be confused with the Tin How Temple two blocks to the south, which is likewise dedicated to Matsu (carrying one of her popular names in Cantonese), but was founded in 1910 and is the oldest extant Taoist temple in Chinatown.

== Bibliography ==
- Miller, James (2006). Chinese Religions in Contemporary Societies. ISBN 978-1-85109-626-8.
