= Kong Chow Temple =

- 岡州古廟
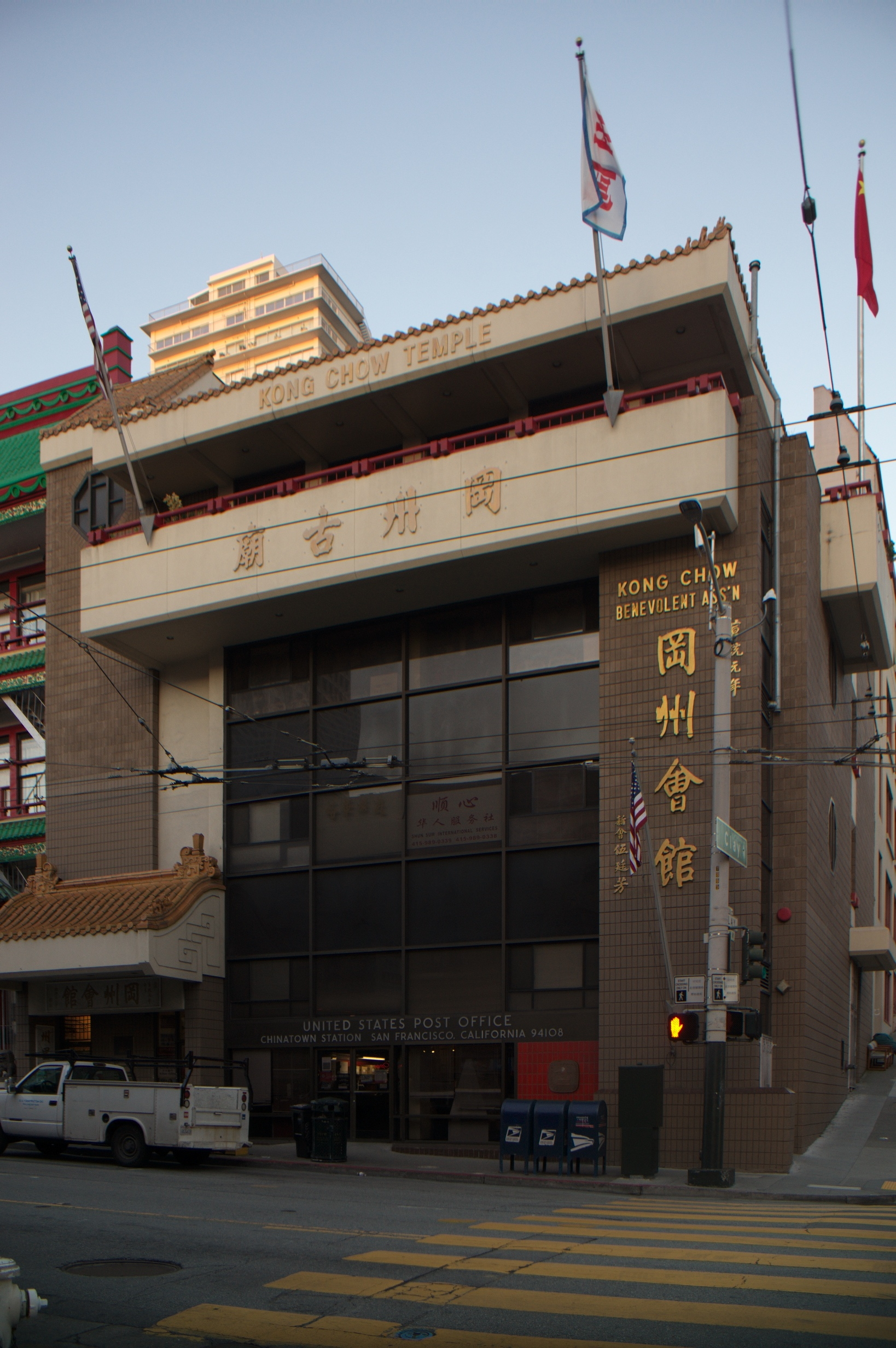

- Location within San Francisco Location within San Francisco Bay Area

Location
- Location: Corner of Stockton and Clay
- Municipality: San Francisco
- State: California
- Interactive map of Kong Chow Temple
- Sector: Chinatown
- Coordinates: 37.793824°N 122.408071°W

Kong Chow Temple (traditional Chinese: 岡州古廟; simplified Chinese: 冈州古庙; pinyin: Gāngzhōu Gǔmiào; Jyutping: gong1 zau1 gu2 miu6) is a temple dedicated to Guan Di, located in the Chinatown neighborhood of San Francisco, California, in the United States.

== History ==
The temple was founded, in 1849, by members of the Cantonese population of San Francisco. In 1854, the temple was renamed Kong Chow Clan Association, to stress the social activities planned by the temple. The Association provided social welfare and religious needs for the community. Like many buildings in the area, it was destroyed in the 1906 San Francisco earthquake, and the community worked together to rebuild it at its original location, 520 Pine, near St. Mary's Square.

The Los Angeles branch of the Kong Chow Family Association and Temple was designed by architect Gilbert Leong and opened in 1960.

=== Bess Truman's visit ===
Bess Truman visited the temple in 1948, where she prayed for positive results for her husband, Harry S. Truman's presidential run. While there, she also asked for a prediction about the results, due to the public's prediction that he would lose. She held a container of Kau cim sticks, and shook them until one of the sticks fell to the ground. This stick was then exchanged for a piece of paper, which told a story, offering insight to her question. The prediction was favorable, and Truman would go on to win the presidential election. The prediction slip that was given to her is displayed in the temple.

=== Protests ===
In 1968 and 1969, while in her nineties, Charlotte Ah Tye Chang led protests against plans to demolish the old Kong Chow Temple. Her niece, artist Nanying Stella Wong, joined her efforts. Chang did not live to see the old temple demolished, or the new Kong Chow Temple erected at another location in 1977.

== Today ==
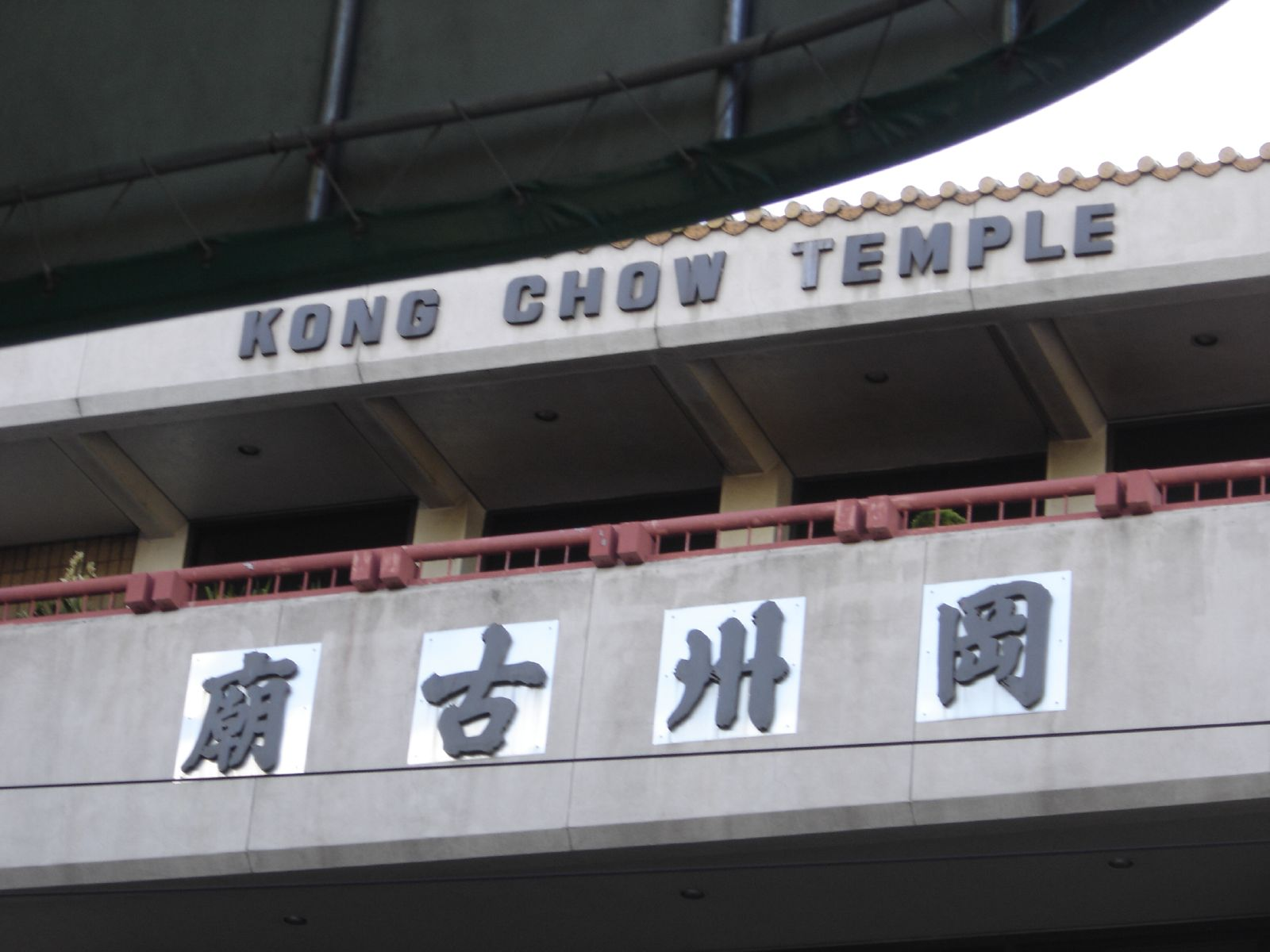
Sign detail

In 1977, the temple moved to its current building on Stockton Street in Chinatown, known as the Kong Chow Building. The association works closely with the elderly population, offers scholarships and other charitable projects for the neighborhood. They also organize prayer sessions, and participates in the Qing Ming Festival. Inside of the temple is a statue of Guan Di, which is worshipped in the main altar.
