= Chinese Americans in San Antonio =

San Antonio, Texas, has a vibrant history of Chinese immigrants that began as early as the 1880s. As of the 2020 U.S. Census, 3% of San Antonio's population identified as Asian descent. The San Antonio Area is .57% (11,625 residents) Chinese American. San Antonio is the sixth largest city in Texas with the highest Chinese American population and continues to thrive.

== History ==
According to the 1887 First Annual Report of the Agricultural Bureau of the Department of Agriculture, Insurance, Statistics, and History, the population of Chinese in San Antonio was 19. In the late 1880s, many Chinese residents were employed by the Southern Pacific Railroad and lived in the San Antonio downtown area near a railway depot. They worked in restaurants, groceries, railroad, and other businesses. From 1870 to 1917, immigrants primarily came from other U.S. cities, Mexico, and Southern China. San Antonio's Chinese community has ancestry from the 1917 Pershing Chinese, a Mexican Chinese group of individuals that assisted General John J. Pershing on an expedition to capture Pancho Villa in the Mexican Revolution. One significant organization that supported Chinese Americans in San Antonio includes a Chinese school that opened in 1928 and was operational for 20 years. Additionally, Chinese Gospel Mission, now known as First Chinese Baptist Church San Antonio, started in 1919 and met in the Spanish Governor's Palace. Several Chinese restaurants operated downtown in the 1930s, serving Chinese American cuisine; two notable ones, Hung Fong Chinese Restaurant and Golden Star Cafe, are still operational today. In 1940, the estimated population of American Chinese in San Antonio was 600. To provide the Pershing Chinese immigrants with permanent residency in the United States, General John J. Pershing and others worked with the U.S. Congress to pass Public Resolution 29 in 1941. The 1943 repeal of the Chinese Exclusion Act provided an opportunity for an increase in immigration and U.S. citizenship for Chinese Americans.

In recent years, Chinese Americans have migrated from a variety of locations in the U.S. New opportunities have provided jobs in fields such as academics, medicine, and science, inviting a new group of immigrants. In 2023, a dedication ceremony and new historic marker was held the Pershing Chinese Camp historical location. In 2024, an initiative was began to open an Asian Community Center in the Stone Oak area of San Antonio, and its groundbreaking was in 2026. Annually, San Antonio celebrates Asian-American & Pacific Islander Heritage Month through various activities in May connected with restaurants, educational programs, and celebrations throughout the city sponsored by the City of San Antonio, local restaurants, and organizations. Various festivals celebrating Asian and Asian American culture are hosted throughout the year by San Antonio universities and organizations.

== Notable people ==
- Tom. J. Lee, first Chinese Texan elected to the House of Representatives.
- Elisa Chan, former San Antonio City Council member
- Ted and Rose Wu, San Antonio restauranteurs
- Koon Yen Lim "Papa Lim," San Antonio restaurateur

== See also ==
- History of the Chinese Americans in Dallas-Fort Worth
- History of the Chinese Americans in Houston
- History of Chinese Americans in Texas
- History of Chinese Americans in Austin TX
- History of Chinese Americans in El Paso TX
