= History of Chinese Americans in El Paso, Texas =

The population of the area of El Paso, Texas in the US includes a large number of people with Chinese ancestral backgrounds.

== Railroad Era 1880s ==
The history of Chinese Americans in El Paso begins when Chinese railroad workers arrived in 1881s to build the Southern Pacific Railroad. They built the city and formed a community with restaurants, groceries and laundries.

== Downtown El Paso ==
Downtown El Paso was once of the area where Chinese Americans lived. They formed a community and life in the area with restaurants, groceries and laundries.

Wong Kim Ark, whose citizenship was affirmed by the U.S. Supreme Court in United States v. Wong Kim Ark (1898), was arrested in El Paso in October 1901 on allegations of violating the Chinese Exclusion Acts. The case was dismissed in February 1902. A 1903 city directory lists a cook named Wong Kim Ark residing at 225 South Oregon Street, in what was then El Paso’s Chinatown.

Under the Chinese Exclusion Act, Chinese laborers already working in El Paso could remain, but their wives and children were barred from joining them in the United States. Many of these families settled across the Rio Grande in Ciudad Juárez, and some family members tried to cross the river to reunite with relatives in El Paso.

Local tradition holds that a house in the Sunset Heights neighborhood, known as the Turtle House, served as a safe house for Chinese migrants crossing the border undetected, many of them the wives and children of laborers. According to local historian [first name] Varela, migrants were told to look for a red brick house with a large concrete turtle on its side, where they could enter the basement and reach a network of tunnels said to run beneath Sunset Heights.

== Notable people ==
- Herlinda Wong Chew
- Antonio Yee Chew
- Wellington Yee Chew
- David Wellington Chew
- Linda Yee Chew
- Patricia B. Chew

== See also ==
- History of Chinese Americans in Texas
- History of Chinese Americans in Austin, Texas
- Chinese Americans in Dallas–Fort Worth
- History of Chinese Americans in Houston
