= Herlinda Wong Chew =

- Born: Wong Sun Far c. 1894; Guadalajara, Jalisco, Mexico
- Died: August 6, 1939; Portland, Oregon, U.S.

Herlinda Wong Chew (c. 1894 – August 5, 1939), born Wong Sun Far, was a Mexican-born businesswoman, interpreter, and self-taught immigration specialist of Chinese descent who worked on behalf of Chinese and Mexican immigrants in El Paso, Texas, United States. After helping Chinese families find refuge in El Paso during the Mexican Revolution, she moved there with her family in 1922, where she ran grocery stores, assisted immigrants with U.S. immigration law, and took part in many civic organizations. She was inducted into the El Paso Women's Hall of Fame in 1992, and the city named a street in her honor in 2000.

== Early life ==
Wong was born around 1894 in Guadalajara, Mexico, to Carlos Wong (aka Wong Tung), a Chinese immigrant who owned a hotel, and Francisca Pérez, a Mexican woman of Aztec ancestry. According to her family, her feet were bound when she was a child. She attended a Methodist Episcopal school in Guadalajara through the sixth grade but continued studying on her own, and in later life spoke English, Spanish, French, Cantonese, and Mandarin.

At about eighteen she married Antonio (Yee Wing) Chew, a Chinese immigrant who had come to Mexico around 1905 and opened a grocery store in Ciudad Juárez. In 1914, the couple founded the grocery firm Chew and Look with partner Joe Yat Look, operating a store on Comercio Street in Ciudad Juárez that supplied Chinese and Mexican merchants during the revolution.

== Mexican Revolution and move to El Paso ==
The Mexican Revolution brought a rise in violence against Chinese residents of Mexico, including the Torreón massacre of 1911, and in 1914 revolutionaries reportedly targeted Chinese merchants in Ciudad Juárez. After being warned of an impending attack by members of Pancho Villa's forces, the Chews took temporary refuge in El Paso, and Herlinda Chew helped arrange temporary asylum there for about 200 other Chinese families. Planning to open a wholesale grocery business in the United States, Chew studied U.S. immigration law and found that the Chinese Exclusion Act permitted Chinese merchants to immigrate legally. The family entered the United States at Calexico, California, on February 17, 1922, declaring their intention to settle in El Paso. In February 1923, they opened the New China grocery store in El Paso; by 1930 they operated four stores, one of them managed by Herlinda Chew.

== Legacy ==
In poor health, Chew traveled to Portland, Oregon, in July 1939, hoping a change of climate would help, and died there on August 5, 1939. Her husband died a month later in El Paso. They had eight children and are buried in Restlawn Memorial Park in El Paso. Chew was inducted into the El Paso Women's Hall of Fame in 1992, and in November 2000 the city of El Paso named a street Herlinda Chew Way in her memory.

Her work influenced her son, Wellington Yee Chew, who became the first Chinese American to pass the bar exam in Texas. His three children, David Wellington Chew, Linda Yee Chew, and Patricia B. Chew all became justices in Texas. David Wellington Chew was elected as chief justice of the Texas Eighth District Court of Appeals in 1994.

== See also ==
- Downtown El Paso
- History of Chinese Americans in Texas
- History of Chinese Americans in El Paso Texas
