= Joe Lung =

Chinese-born restaurateur in Austin, Texas (1864–1926)

Joe Lung (1864–1926) was a Chinese-born restaurateur in Austin, Texas. He operated the Joe Lung Café and provided informal loans to Chinese, African American, and Hispanic residents who faced barriers to obtaining credit. His family was among Austin's early Chinese American families.

== Early life and family ==
Lung was born in Hoi Ping, China, now known as Kaiping in the province of Guangdong. He immigrated to the United States with his brother Fong during the 1870s and worked on railroads before entering the restaurant business. The National Register nomination for the Lung House gives his birth date as August 7, 1864, and records his employment with the Houston & Texas Central Railway.

In 1889, he married Dora Wong in Calvert, Texas. They had six sons and three daughters. Their daughter Inez Lung Lee earned a master's degree in history at the University of Texas at Austin and worked as a Baptist missionary and English teacher at Pooi To Girls Academy in Guangzhou and Hong Kong between 1927 and 1958.

== Restaurant business and community support ==
Fong established a restaurant in Austin in 1897. Joe and his sons also worked in the business. By 1906, a city directory listed the Joe Lung Café at 204 Congress Avenue. The café served American food rather than Chinese cuisine. Its customers included farmers who came to Austin to sell their produce.

Lung also supplied loans to members of Austin's Chinese community and to African American and Hispanic residents excluded from conventional financial services. In 1917, he purchased a house at 1605 Canterbury Street in East Austin.

In 1917, Lung sent money from Texas to commission Long Hui Lou, a watchtower in his hometown of Kaiping. He never returned to see the building.

== Death and legacy ==
Lung died in 1926. Dora and their children continued operating the café. His son Sam subsequently operated Lung's Chinese Kitchen, which opened in 1945. Later managed by Lung's grandson Joe Michael Lung, it closed in 1974.

The family's Canterbury Street home, known as the Lung House, is listed on the National Register of Historic Places for its association with Austin's Chinese American history.
