= Tom J. Lee =

American politician

Thomas J. Lee

Texas House of Representatives District 68
- In office January 12, 1965 – January 10, 1967

Personal details
- Born: September 25, 1923
- Died: November 7, 1996 (aged 73)
- Party: Democratic
- First Asian-American to serve in the Texas Legislature

Thomas J. Lee (September 25, 1923 – November 7, 1996) was an American politician. Lee was elected to the 68th district of the Texas House of Representatives in 1965, and was the first Asian-American to serve in the Texas Legislature.
