= History of Chinese Americans in Texas =

Chinese American history

Texas is home to 294,222 Chinese American residents, about 5.3% of the nation’s Chinese American population, or roughly 1 in every 19 Chinese Americans in the United States (U.S. Census Bureau, ACS 2020–2024 5-Year Estimates) Many live in Austin, Houston, Plano, and Sugar Land. According to U.S. Census Bureau, Houston has the highest Chinese American population with 42,537 while Austin ranked second with 21,699.

== History ==
=== Calvert (Robertson County) ===
After May 1869, a group of Chinese workers in the Western United States began moving to Texas, as there was a demand for labor in the post-American Civil War environment. Railroad companies in particular wanted workers to rebuild their infrastructure. According to Irwin Tang, in November 1869, San Francisco contractor Chew-Ah-Heung contracted 250, some say 300, Chinese laborer with Houston & Texas Central Railroad. These Chinese laborers crossed the frozen Missouri River and arrived to the Galveston port. Among them, there was Lee Chopp, who later settled in Calvert, TX and married to a formerly enslaved woman, Martha Jane, formed the first Chinese Black community along with Bar Low and Tom Yepp, who was married to Martha's sister Moriah.

In 1880, Robertson County reported 72 ethnic Chinese residents, while the other 64 were elsewhere in the state. The largest group of Chinese in the period circa 1869-1889 or so were in that county.

=== El Paso ===
A second group of Chinese immigrants arrived from the West Coast of the United States around 1881 in El Paso, Texas, as members of the first group had died or moved away, elsewhere or back to China. In 1890, fourteen Texas counties had ten or more ethnic Chinese. The ethnic Chinese population began to decrease around 1900. In 1910, there were 595 ethnic Chinese, with eleven Texas counties having ten or more ethnic Chinese.

El Paso, Texas, was once one of the most populated town for Chinese population. There is a Chinese cemetery traced back to 1890s.

=== San Angelo (Tom Green County) ===
By the early 1880s a small number of Chinese immigrants lived in and around San Angelo in Tom Green County. Testimony summarized in an 1885 decision of the Texas Court of Appeals records that four Chinese men, Chan Sing, Hung Ah Hang, Hung Ah Ho and Si King, lived together on a farm owned by J. D. Spears, then sheriff of Tom Green County, where they raised vegetables that they sold in San Angelo. The same testimony refers to a laundry in the town run by a Chinese man named Sing Kee.

Chan Sing disappeared in July 1884, and partial remains identified by his clothing were later found at the confluence of the South and Middle Concho rivers. Hung Ah Hang was convicted of murder in the Tom Green County district court and sentenced to life imprisonment. Two Chinese residents testified at the trial: Louie, for the prosecution, and Sing Kee, for the defense. In June 1885 the Court of Appeals reversed the conviction, holding that the evidence was "wholly insufficient" to sustain it, and remanded the case.

== Notable People ==
- Lee Chopp (Calvert)
- Herlinda Wong Chew (El, Paso)
- Joe Lung (Austin)
- Inez Lung Lee (Austin)
- Ted Wu & Rose Wu (San Antonio)
- Albert Gee (Houston)
