= History of Chinese Americans in Austin, Texas =

Chinese Americans in Austin, Texas, According to U.S. Census estimates, the Chinese population in the city of Austin totals approximately 21,699 residents, making Austin the second-ranked city for Chinese Americans in Texas (ranking 24th nationally). Across the broader Austin–Round Rock metropolitan area, the Chinese population reaches roughly 38,713 residents.

However, Chinese Americans in Austin have a documented history dating to the nineteenth century. Early Chinese residents worked in railroad construction and operated businesses including laundries, grocery stores, and restaurants. The Austin History Center has documented the experiences of early families through photographs, archival collections, and public exhibitions.

== History ==
Austin newspapers referred to Chinese residents as early as 1874. The city's 1875 census recorded 20 Chinese men, many of whom had previously worked on railroad construction in California and Mexico.

Chinese immigration was restricted by federal policies, including the Chinese Exclusion Act of 1882. According to the Austin History Center, the Chinese population in Travis County grew following the act's repeal in 1943 and subsequent immigration reforms, including the Immigration Act of 1965.

== Community life ==
Early Chinese families in Austin operated restaurants, grocery stores, and laundries. Some of the earliest restaurants include Sam Wah Cafe and Lung's Cafe. Started with Joe Fong, older brother of Joe Lung and which their last name is supposed to be Zhou, or Chou, or Chow(中文：周) , first came to Austin to seek opportunties. Joe was recruited to come help and often travel back and forth from Austin to Waco to see his families. According to Miss Chou:Biography of Inez Lung Lee, the Lung family operated restaurant and food businesses in downtown Austin between 1906 and 1974.

Inez Lung Lee, daughter of Joe and Dora Lung, earned a master's degree in history from the University of Texas at Austin. From 1927 to 1958, she worked as a Baptist missionary and English teacher, primarily at Pooi To School in Guangzhou, later in Hong Kong.

Lee also supported racial integration at Austin’s First Baptist Church. During a 1963 discussion of church membership, she urged church leaders not to exclude Black applicants.

Among Austin's earliest Chinese residents was Joe Sing(born Jo Feng Sheng, 1860), who had lived in Galveston, Boston, Shreveport, and New Orleans before settling in the city. With his wife, Francisca Moreno, he ran the Hong Lee Laundry, which served bankers, legislators, and office workers along Congress Avenue. The Chinese Exclusion Act barred Sing from becoming a U.S. citizen, and under federal law at the time Moreno lost her own citizenship by marrying him. Sing is buried in the Oakwood Cemetery Annex in Austin.

== Historical documentation ==
The Austin History Center's exhibition Early Chinese Families of Austin documents the Lung, Ng, Sing, Tu, and Wong families. Its Asian American Community Archivist Program collects photographs, records, and oral histories relating to Asian communities in Austin and Travis County.

Austin PBS's documentary collection Austin Revealed: Pioneers from the East includes episodes about the Wong, Lung, and Sing families. Among them, pioneer Joe Lung was first settled in Calvert, TX, moved to Austin in 1906 to start the Lung Cafe at 204 Congress, later moved to Sixth between Brazos and San Jacinto.

In 2025 Austin’s Central Library hosted Roots Unveiled: Chinese American History 1783–1945, an exhibition combining historical artifacts, archival materials, oral histories, and contemporary artworks to explore Chinese American history, including the experiences of families in Austin. The exhibition included Cousins, a photographic series connecting branches of the Lung family in the United States and China and Inez in Canton, an installation depicting Inez's life in Canton with furnitures she brought back to Austin from China.

== See also ==
- History of the Chinese Americans in Dallas-Fort Worth
- History of the Chinese Americans in Houston
- History of Chinese Americans in Texas
- History of Chinese Americans in San Antonio
