= Chinese Americans in Dallas–Fort Worth =

The Dallas-Fort Worth (DFW) area has a population of Chinese Americans (both recent immigrants and Americans born of Chinese descent). In the second half of the 19th century, the area became permanently settled by non-Native Americans, and citizens of Chinese descent began to make the area their home as well. In modern times, the main population of Chinese Americans is scattered around the northern suburbs of the City of Dallas.

== History ==
The first person of Chinese descent listed in the Dallas city directory is J.L. Chow. He began boarding at the Central Hotel in 1873 and opened the Chow Chow Laundry in 1874. It was located at 904 Elm Street. Additional Chinese residents came in the wake of a strike at Houston and Texas Central Railway (H&TC). Like many early Chinese immigrants to the United States (US), most of these Chinese immigrants came from Southern China, and many initially came to work in the railroad industry. After settling in Dallas, some Chinese established businesses such as laundries, and others worked as cooks and domestic servants in residences of white Dallasites. There were 15 Chinese laundries in Dallas by 1886. The city had 43 Chinese, including 41 laundry owners and workers, one physician, and a domestic servant by 1891. Chinese people had been listed in city directories with the marker "Chinese". In the late 1800s, anti-Chinese sentiment was prevalent throughout the US, and at times, Dallas was no different. A propaganda campaign against the Chinese laundries occurred in 1894 when negative articles appeared in the Dallas Times Herald and The Dallas Morning News. By 1896 the Chinese business operations diversified and continued to operate despite the propaganda campaign.

According to the 1900 U.S. Census, Dallas County had 22 ethnic Chinese. A local directory published the same year stated that there were 25 ethnic Chinese in the City of Dallas. At that time, there was a grouping of businesses owned and operated by Chinese in the Downtown Dallas area. Stanley Solamillo, author of From Half a World Away: The First Chinese in Dallas: 1873 - 1940, wrote that the frequency was "roughly the same" compared to the frequency of businesses owned and operated by Asians in Downtown Dallas in 2007. The businesses were spread throughout Downtown instead of being concentrated in a Chinatown, and there were other Chinese businesses in Oak Cliff and South Dallas. By 1900 four laundries remained, and other businesses included groceries and restaurants. By 1910 three Chinese restaurants were in Dallas, while no grocery stores were operated by the Chinese, and the number of businesses decreased after that point. The city had three Chinese living there by 1913.

About 10 to 30 ethnic Chinese arrived in Dallas in the 1930s, marking a second wave of immigration. In 2001 Esther Wu, a former editor of the Dallas Morning News, interviewed Fay Joe, a man from Shanghai who had emigrated to Dallas in 1939 in the wake of the Second Sino-Japanese War. He stated that the five Chinese families in Dallas at that time were all restaurant owners.

Wu stated that Chinese immigration to Richardson began in 1975. Since then the Chinese community has expanded to the north. In the mid-1980s, most Chinese K-12 students in the DFW area resided in Richardson. By 1991 Chinese professionals were settling in rapidly expanding Plano in Collin County. According to the 2000 U.S. census, 5,762 ethnic Chinese lived in Dallas County. After 2000, Collin County continued to expand rapidly in size and population, and many Chinese Americans began to call places like Allen, Frisco, and McKinney home.

== Demographics ==
Rank	City	Chinese-Americans Alone or in Combination (2024 ACS estimate)
1	Plano	13,469
2	Dallas	11,181
3	Frisco	6,083
4	Fort Worth	5,724
5	Allen	5,689
6	Richardson	4,357
7	McKinney	3,922
8	Lewisville	3,140
9	Arlington	2,838
10	Carrolton	2,439

Plano, along with Houston, has one of the state's two major settlements of Chinese Americans. In the 2000 U.S. census, 17% of the foreign born residents of Plano originated from China. The 2010 U.S. census stated that there were 14,500 ethnic Chinese in Plano. Out of the cities with 250,000 and more residents, Plano has the sixth largest percentage of ethnic Chinese, which made up 5.2% of the city's population. Charlie Yue, the executive vice president of the Association of Chinese Professionals, stated that he estimated that about 30,000 Plano residents are Chinese and that many "don't participate in government activities, like the census." Richardson also has a large Chinese immigrant community. In 2010 over 15% of the people in Richardson were ethnic Chinese.

== Institutions ==
As the DFW Chinese American population grew, it established many ethnic Chinese cultural organizations. Most of them are headquartered in Plano and Richardson. The Dallas Chinese Community Center (DCCC; traditional Chinese: 達拉斯華人活動中心; simplified Chinese: 达拉斯华人活动中心; pinyin: Dálāsī Huárén Huódòngzhōngxīn) is located in the DFW Chinatown shopping center in Richardson. The center offers meeting space, English as a second language (ESL) classes and 20,000 books written in Simplified Chinese; the center imports some books from China.

== Education ==
In 1991 the Plano Independent School District (PISD) began a Chinese bilingual program for preschool and kindergarten students developed by Donna Lam. It was established after Chinese professionals began to settle Plano. Many Chinese parents in Plano enroll their children in supplementary schools, where they get additional mathematics education and Chinese language education. The University of Texas at Dallas in Richardson, as of 2012, had almost 1,000 Chinese students. It has a program to recruit students of Chinese origin.

== Economy ==
Many early Chinese immigrants established restaurants, and that practice has continued throughout Chinese American history in the Dallas area. Chinese restaurants can now be found throughout the entire Metroplex. However, many of these restaurants cater mostly to generic American tastes. Chinese restaurants catering to more traditional ethnic Chinese cuisine are mainly in Plano, Frisco, and Richardson. In the late 2010s through the 2020s, Frisco and Plano have experienced an influx of mainland Chinese and Taiwanese chains including Haidilao and Gong Cha. This is part of a shift in Dallas from restaurants owned by Chinese immigrants to more commercial, overseas sources of ethnic cuisine.

When Chinese immigration increased beginning in the 1970s, most immigrants came as working professionals and not to establish laundries, groceries, or restaurants. Many settled in the Richardson area near the technology companies where they worked. Soon, many Asian businesses began opening in the area. The DFW China Town shopping center is located in Richardson. One of the first large Asian supermarkets in the Dallas area opened in that complex. Eventually, Asian businesses encompassed the entire complex, which resulted in the center being renamed 'China Town'. As the population began to move northward, similar complexes with Asian restaurants, supermarkets, and businesses were established in Plano, Frisco, and other Collin County cities. Following the success of Chinese and Taiwanese supermarket chains like 99 Ranch Market in the metroplex, chains like Mitsuwa Marketplace and Patel Brothers have begun to service the general south, east, and southeast Asian communities in Dallas.

== Religion ==
A significant number of Chinese Americans in the area have either converted to or were born into Christianity. In 2012, there were six Chinese churches in Plano.

The Roman Catholic Diocese of Dallas maintains a Chinese mission at Mission of the Sacred Heart of Jesus in Richardson, which was established in 1987.

== Transportation ==
In 2015, DFW-based American Airlines began a non-stop flight service to Beijing, China, a result of both the strong trade relationship between Texas and China and the significant population of Chinese Americans and Chinese immigrants in the metroplex.

As of 2016 the Taiwanese airline EVA Air operates a shuttle bus service from Richardson to George Bush Intercontinental Airport in Houston, Texas, so that Dallas-based customers may fly on its services to and from Houston.

== Notable people ==
- Angie Chen Button (politician)
- Laura Gao (cartoonist, author of Messy Roots) - From Coppell
- Wang Zhizhi (basketball player)

== See also ==
- History of Chinese Americans
- History of Chinese American in Austin, TX
