= 1905 Chinese boycott =

Boycott of American goods in the Qing dynasty

The Chinese Boycott of 1905 was a large-scale boycott of American goods in Qing dynasty that began on 10 May 1905. The catalyst was the Gresham-Yang Treaty of 1894, which was an extension of the 1882 Chinese Exclusion Act. An indirect cause was the years of violence against Chinese immigrants in the United States, most recently during the 1900–1904 San Francisco plague. The boycott lasted for almost one year and garnered support from major Chinese organizations. It came to an end when the Qing government revoked its support for the boycott. Ultimately the boycott did not change any discriminatory laws in the US; however, the Chinatown raids eventually ceased. The boycott extended across to the Chinese diaspora in the Philippines, Singapore, Malaysia, Japan and Hawaii.

== Causes ==
=== US legislative history on excluding Chinese ===
The Chinese were brought to the U.S. under a contract system to help with the construction of the pacific coast railroad. A treaty negotiated by the Secretary William H. Seward called The Burlingame Treaty of 1868 allowed unlimited freedom for the Chinese to immigrate to the United States. The treaty also prohibited the U.S. from meddling into China's internal affairs as well as granted American citizens privilege in China. By 1880 The U.S. modified the treaty to restrict the immigration of Chinese workers with the approval of China. Two years later in 1882 congress passed the Chinese Exclusion Act that required Chinese immigrants residing in the United States to carry identification papers with them at all times. Extensions of the act include the 1888 Scott Act, 1892 Geary Act and, 1894 Gresham-Yang Treaty.

==== 1894 Treaty ====
The 1894 Gresham-Yang Treaty automatically extended for 10 years after its expiration on December 7, 1904, unless further negotiation was made. It was the further negotiation in May 1905 at Beijing that sparked the boycott. Just before the boycott, US sent her new ambassador, William Woodville Rockhill, to Beijing.

=== Violence against Chinese immigrants ===
Among other violent episodes against Chinese immigrants is the Boston Chinatown immigration raid of October 11, 1903. During the San Francisco plague of 1900–1904 other episodes of racial discrimination against Chinese immigrants had taken place.

=== 1905 Boston incident ===
In 1905, four Chinese students were detained in Boston by immigration officials. This gave momentum to the boycott movement.

== The boycott ==
The boycott originated when the Chinese Consolidated Benevolent Association of San Francisco called upon the people of China to pressure the United States into treating the Chinese immigrants in America better. Afterwards, telegrams were sent out by Tseng Shao-Ching, leader of the Shanghai Chamber of Commerce to merchants to boycott American products; if the merchant refuse, the boycott committee would ensure that they follow their instructions.

== Timeline ==
Chinese immigrants were brought to the U.S. under a contract system to help with the construction of the Pacific Coast railroad. The Burlingame Treaty of 1868 was negotiated by Secretary William H. Seward allowed unlimited freedom for the Chinese to immigrate to the United States. A majority of Chinese migrated out of China to go to the United States suffered a huge amount of discrimination and prejudice compared to Chinese who have gone to other countries.

Several events lead up to the boycott of 1905. These events were regarded as attempts to expel the Chinese from America during the late nineteenth and early twentieth centuries.

| 1882 | - | Chinese Exclusion Act | The Chinese Exclusion Act was created to ban more Chinese immigrants from migrating into the United States. Once the Chinese Exclusion Act was enacted, the government officials were merciless and arrested every Chinese men they could find, regardless of the fact that some of them did own the proper paperwork to stay in the United States. The U.S. government official's ill-treatment of the Chinese men had created tension between the Chinese and Americans. |
| 1892 | - | Geary Act | Following the expiration of Exclusion Act, the Geary Act was enacted and caused the suspension of Chinese immigrations for another ten years. This also required that all Chinese laborers in the United States register with the government within one year in order to obtain certificates of lawful residence. Those that were caught without this lawful resident certificate were then subject to immediate deportation. This act also deprived Chinese immigrants of court protection, as well as denying them bail.: Fong Yue Ting v. United States: Many Chinese residents in city communities of Los Angeles and San Francisco refused to comply by ripping up official registration notices. But after three Chinese residents facing deportation took their case to the Supreme Court, the Court decided that, as a nation, the United States had the right to determine its own immigration policy and force all foreign nationals to register. |
| 1895 | - | Lem Moon Sing v. United States | The Supreme Court's ruling of district courts no longer being able to review Chinese habeas corpus petitions led to corruption and abuse by immigration authorities who used this power to bar and/or deport Chinese immigrants. |
| 1897 | - | | After the Supreme Court's ruling of denying due process to citizens by giving the power to immigration authorities to decide who was and who wasn't a citizen without the need for review by any court, Chinese admission rates into the United States began to drop. From the years 1897 to 1899, about one in ten (725 of 7,762) Chinese were rejected and then between the years 1903 and 1905, the application rejection rate raised to one in 4 Chinese applicants. |
| 1899 | - | Reports of Deaths from the Plague in Hong Kong | Honolulu's Board of Health respond by restricting local Chinese from boarding ships that were headed for the continental United States and by burning down a section of the city's Chinatown. San Francisco health officials followed this example by shutting down all Chinese-owned businesses and by ordering all Chinese to submit to inoculation before leaving the city. |
| 1900 to 1904 | - | Third Plague Pandemic (San Francisco) | In early January 1900, a group of medical experts state that because of improvements in sanitation in a "progressive civilization", America would not be prone to foreign illnesses—the Bubonic plague was considered to be an "Oriental disease" that lurked in contaminated Asian soil; since its bacilli was considered to be generated from filthy matter, so those who adhered to the new Western hygienic principles were less likely to contract the disease. |
| 1903 | - | Boston Chinatown Immigration Raid | |
| 1905 | - | United States v. Ju Toy | |

== Organizations involved ==
The boycott drew support from many major Chinese organizations, including

- Chinese Consolidated Benevolent Association
- Chinese Americans under protection of Zhuyue Zongju
