= Chinatown, Boston =

Neighborhood of Boston, Massachusetts, United States

Coordinates: 42.3501°N 71.0601°W

Chinatown
- Neighborhood of Boston
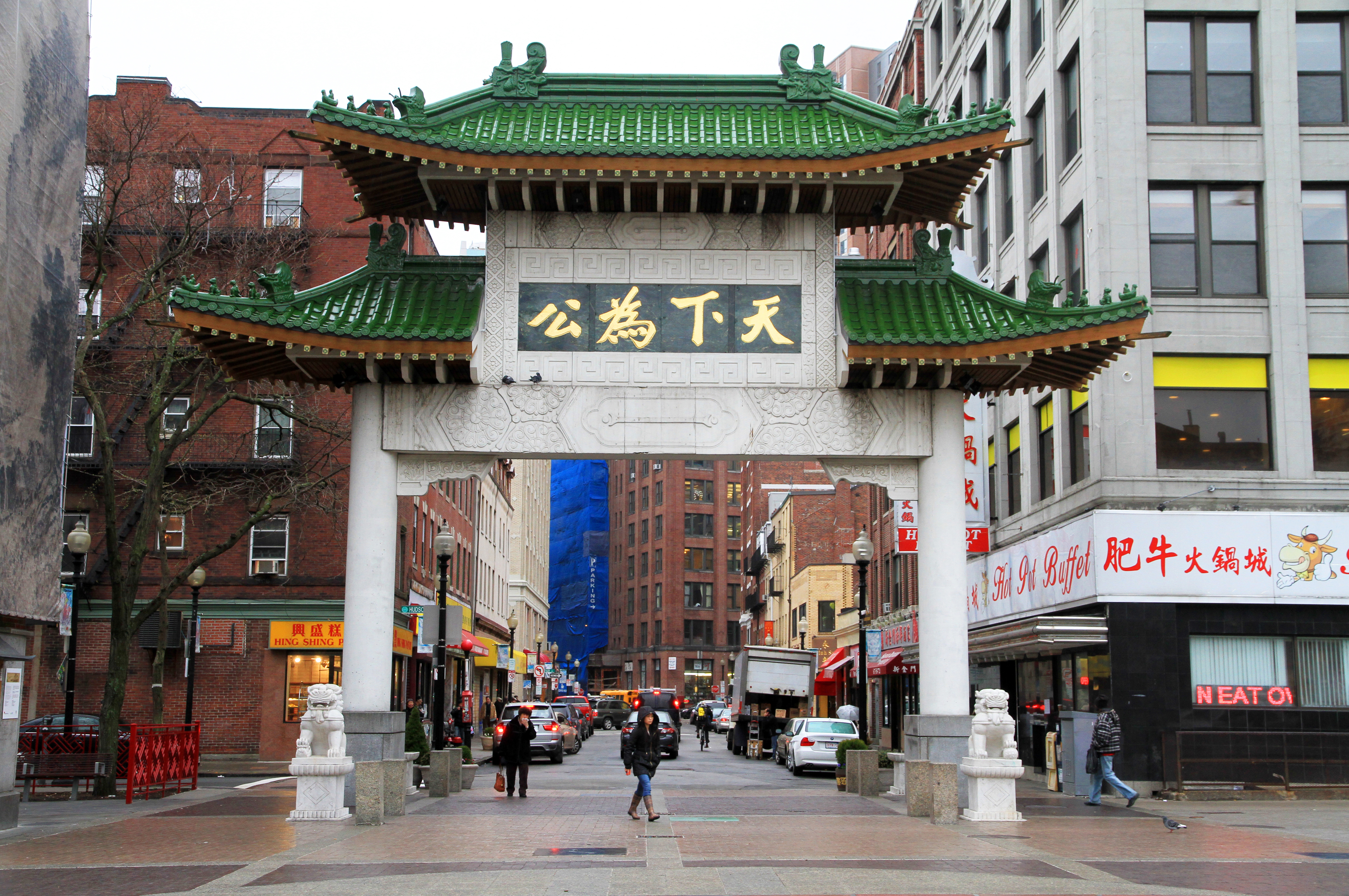
- The paifang gate in 2013
- Interactive map of Chinatown
- Country: United States
- State: Massachusetts
- County: Suffolk
- Neighborhood of: Boston
- Time zone: UTC-5 (Eastern)
- Zip Code: 02111
- Area code: 617 / 857

Chinese name
- Traditional Chinese: 波士頓唐人街
- Simplified Chinese: 波士顿唐人街
Transcriptions
Standard Mandarin
- Hanyu Pinyin: Bōshìdùn Tángrénjiē
- Gwoyeu Romatzyh: Boshyhduenn Tarngrenjie
- Wade–Giles: Po^{1}shih^{4}tun^{4} T'ang^{2}jen^{2}chieh^{1}
- Tongyong Pinyin: Boshìhdùn Tángrénjie
- IPA: [pwóʂɻ̩̂twə̂n tʰǎŋɻə̌ntɕjé]
Hakka
- Romanization: Poˊ sii dunˋ tongˇ nginˇ gieˊ
Yue: Cantonese
- Yale Romanization: bō sih deuhn tòhng yàhn gāai
- Jyutping: Bo1si6deon6 Tong4jan4gaai1
- IPA: [pɔ́ːsìtɵ̀n tʰɔ̏ːŋjɐ̏nkáːi]
Southern Min
- Hokkien POJ: Pho-sū-tùn Tn̂g-lâng-ke

Alternative Chinese name
- Traditional Chinese: 波士頓華埠
- Simplified Chinese: 波士顿华埠
Transcriptions
Standard Mandarin
- Hanyu Pinyin: Bōshìdùn Huá Bù
- Gwoyeu Romatzyh: Boshyhduenn Hwabuh
- Wade–Giles: Po^{1}shih^{4}tun^{4} Hua^{2}pu^{4}
- Tongyong Pinyin: Boshìhdùn Huá Bù
- IPA: [pwóʂɻ̩̂twə̂n xwǎpʰû]
Hakka
- Romanization: Poˊ sii dunˋ faˇ pu
Yue: Cantonese
- Yale Romanization: bō sih deuhn wàh bouh
- Jyutping: Bo1si6deon6 Waa4bou6
- IPA: [pɔ́ːsìtɵ̀n wȁːpòu]
Southern Min
- Hokkien POJ: Pho-sū-tùn Hôa-bú

Chinatown, Boston (Chinese: 波士頓唐人街; Cantonese: 唐人街; Jyutping: Tong4jan4gaai1) is a neighborhood located in downtown Boston, Massachusetts, United States. It is the only surviving historic ethnic Chinese enclave in New England since the demise of the Chinatowns in Providence, Rhode Island, and Portland, Maine, after the 1950s. Because of the high population of Asians and Asian Americans living in this area of Boston, there is an abundance of Chinese and Vietnamese restaurants located in Chinatown. It is one of the most densely populated residential areas in Boston and serves as the largest center of its East Asian and Southeast Asian cultural life.

Chinatown borders the Boston Common, Downtown Crossing, the Washington Street Theatre District, Bay Village, the South End, and the Southeast Expressway/Massachusetts Turnpike. Boston's Chinatown is one of the largest Chinatowns outside of New York City.

== Demographics ==
Historical population
Census	Pop.	Note	%±
1990	4,881		—
2000	5,242		7.4%
2010	5,848		11.6%
Asian American population

Because it is a gathering place and home to many immigrants, Chinatown has a diverse culture and population. According to 2020 census data, the total population in Chinatown is 5,460. This is an almost 53% increase since 2000, when there were only 3,559 people. The white population rose 241.7% from 228 in 2000 to 779 in 2010. The Black and African American population rose from 82 in 2000 to 139 in 2010, showing an almost 70% increase. The American Indian population dropped 75% from 2000 to 2010, going from 8 to 2 residents. The Asian population grew about 7.5% from 3,190 in 2000 to 3,416 in 2010. People who identified as another race grew from 18 in 2000 to 30 in 2010, a 66.7% increase. Those who identified as more than one race grew from 32 in 2000 to 77 in 2010, as increase of 140.6%.

With more white residents moving into Chinatown, there is worry about gentrification. For instance, the Asian population dropped to 46% in 2010. Another major concern is that historic towns and places are becoming more touristy and less cultural. Among Boston, New York, and Philadelphia, Boston has shown the highest increase in non-Asian residents moving into non-family shared households, with a 450% increase from 1990 to 2000.

The total number of housing units in Chinatown has increased by 54% from 2000 to 2010. Chinatown went from 1,367 to 2,114 housing units. There has been an almost 50% increase in the occupied housing units in Chinatown from 2000 to 2010, going from 1,327 to 1,982. With the increase in occupied housing units, there has also been a 230% increase in vacant homes, going from 40 in 2000 to 132 in 2010.

=== Race and ancestry ===
Chinatown/Financial District/Leather District (02111) Racial Breakdown of Population (2017)
Race	Percentage of 02111 population	Percentage of Massachusetts population	Percentage of United States population	ZIP Code-to-State Difference	ZIP Code-to-USA Difference
Asian	51.9%	6.9%	5.8%	+45.0%	+46.1%
White	41.7%	81.3%	76.6%	–39.6%	–34.9%
White (Non-Hispanic)	38.1%	72.1%	60.7%	–24.0%	–22.6%
Hispanic	4.5%	11.9%	18.1%	–7.4%	–13.6%
Black	2.8%	8.8%	13.4%	–6.0%	–10.6%
Native American/Hawaiian	0.0%	0.6%	1.5%	–0.6%	–1.5%
Two or more races	2.7%	2.4%	2.7%	+0.3%	+0.0%

According to the 2012-2016 American Community Survey 5-Year Estimates, the largest ancestry groups in ZIP Code 02111 are:

Ancestry	Percentage of 02111 population	Percentage of Massachusetts population	Percentage of United States population	ZIP Code-to-State Difference	ZIP Code-to-USA Difference
Chinese	43.75%	2.28%	1.24%	+41.47%	+42.51%
Irish	9.65%	21.16%	10.39%	–11.51%	–0.74%
Italian	4.80%	13.19%	5.39%	–8.39%	–0.59%
English	4.65%	9.77%	7.67%	–5.12%	–3.01%
German	3.44%	6.00%	14.40%	–2.57%	–10.96%
French	3.42%	6.82%	2.56%	–3.40%	+0.87%
Polish	2.97%	4.67%	2.93%	–1.69%	+0.04%
Arab	2.38%	1.10%	0.59%	+1.28%	+1.79%
Asian Indian	1.96%	1.39%	1.09%	+0.57%	+0.87%
Korean	1.73%	0.37%	0.45%	+1.36%	+1.28%
Norwegian	1.64%	0.51%	1.40%	+1.13%	+0.24%
Swedish	1.63%	1.67%	1.23%	–0.04%	+0.40%
Filipino	1.51%	0.19%	0.86%	+1.32%	+0.65%
European	1.30%	1.08%	1.23%	+0.21%	+0.06%
Sub-Saharan African	1.26%	2.00%	1.01%	–0.74%	+0.24%
Scottish	1.18%	2.28%	1.71%	–1.11%	–0.54%
American	1.15%	4.26%	6.89%	–3.11%	–5.74%
British	1.12%	0.48%	0.43%	+0.65%	+0.69%

== History ==
=== Early history ===
Part of the Chinatown neighborhood occupies a space that was reclaimed by filling in a tidal flat. The newly created area was first settled by Anglo-Bostonians. After residential properties in this area became less desirable due to railway developments, it was settled by a mixed succession of Irish, Jewish, Italian, Lebanese, and Chinese immigrants. During the late-nineteenth century, garment manufacturing plants also moved into Chinatown, creating Boston's historic garment district. This district was active until the 1990s.

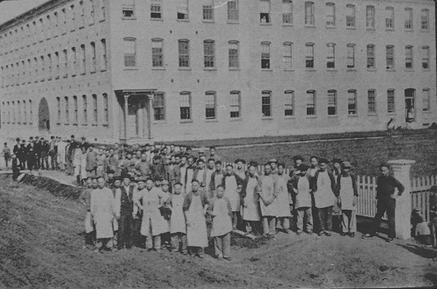
Strike breakers outside of Sampson's Mill, some of whom would later move to Boston to found its Chinatown.

In 1870, the first Chinese people were brought from San Francisco to break a strike at the Sampson Shoe Factory in North Adams, Massachusetts. The arrival of these Chinese workers were met with much hostility from members of the community. There was ill-intentioned words spread about them that were meant to create a bad image for the Chinese to the rest of the community in Boston. Prior to the immigration of Chinese workers from California in 1870, Boston's Chinese population consisted of tea merchants or servants.

In 1874, many of these immigrants moved to the Boston area. As history and tradition details, many Chinese immigrants settled in what is now known as Ping On Alley. The first laundries opened on what is now Harrison Ave in Chinatown. In 1875, as laundries were becoming more and more popular, the first restaurant, Hong Far Low, opened. In the 1800s and the 1900s, many Chinese immigrants came to Boston looking for work and for new opportunities. Due to the Chinese Exclusion Act of 1882, Chinese immigration was halted, and the population of Chinatown remained mostly male. There were many attempts to drive out the Chinese from Chinatown, including the widening of the main street (Harrison Avenue) which backfired and led to further development for the Chinese community. One example of the attempts to drive out the Chinese population was the murder of Wong Yak Chong in 1903 known as the Boston Chinatown immigration raid. The murder gave the police the opportunity to gather Chinese men and deport them. The police and immigration officials were able to arrest 234 people, and then eventually deport 45.

During the time of the Chinese Exclusion Act of 1882 until the 1900s, the Chinese population in the United States almost halved, while the Chinese population in Massachusetts exponentially increased. In 1916 the Kwong Kow Chinese School was established to teach the community Chinese, specifically Taishanese. The population of Chinese in Boston were primarily from the Taishan, Guangdong where the dialect of Chinese is Taishanese. The school was heavily supported by the community, and by 1931 became a vital part of Chinatown.

A wave of immigrants from Lebanon and Syria in the late 1880s and early 1900s constituted a "Little Syria" in South Cove. While the community was largely Christian, as Muslims were often barred from settling in the US, Muslim shipyard workers lived in nearby Quincy and built the first purpose built mosque in New England. The community was later displaced by highway construction.

World War II created a shift in the public opinion of Chinese immigrants with the Republic of China being in the Allied nations. A new wave of Chinese immigrants entered the United States mostly in Chinatown, Boston during this time, after the repeal of the Chinese Exclusion Act. Post-World War II came with an influx of Hong Kong immigrants, who introduced new garment laborers and a new dialect. The language at the Kwong Kow Language School switched from Taishanese to Cantonese with the growing Hong Kong immigrant population.

In the 1950s, Chinatown saw a major increase in population after the Exclusion Act was abolished in 1943. In 1956 there still remained negative attitudes towards Chinatown and attempts to break down the community. The Urban Renewal Division of the Housing Authority tried to demolish most of the South Cove district in favor of urban development. However, before the demolition could occur Mayor John Collins created the Boston Redevelopment Authority to combat the Urban Renewal Division of the Housing Authority's attempt to destroy the community. Construction in the late 1950s, in what is known as the "central artery", affected many homes and businesses in Chinatown. The Massachusetts Turnpike, constructed in the 1960s, took away much of the land from Chinatown that had been used for businesses. After construction was completed, many businesses and homes in Chinatown were affected. Despite this, the population there continued to grow by at least 25%. During the late 19th century, manufacturing plants began to emerge in Chinatown for the garment stores that were thriving there. This became known as the historic garment district in Boston. However, the garment district only lasted until the 1990s due to the rising cost of rent, property sales, and the removal of homeowners.

Negotiations resulted in the provision of funds for the construction of new community housing in Chinatown. During this period, city officials also designated an area adjacent to Chinatown as Boston's red light district, also known as the Combat Zone. This zone, while still in existence, had almost disappeared by the 1990s for many reasons. These causes included city pressure, the rise of marketing movies on VHS home video, and the move of night clubs to the suburbs, where they became more upscale. A general increase in property values, which encouraged building sales and the removal of former tenants, also contributed. In the 21st century, much of the former Combat Zone has evolved into the Washington Street Theatre District.

==== Culture in early history ====
There was a need for a sense of community for the Chinese men who had no family with them in Boston and worked six out of seven days of the week. Various grocery stores and restaurants began catering towards the normalcy of Chinese cuisine and culture. The village associations were a place for the men to create a connections to their far away families because they could exchange letters to them and talk with the other men like them. The gambling rings and ‘opium dens’ were frequent places to go to for leisure. Other groups sought to help the Chinese immigrants with assimilating to the United States. English lessons and other efforts to convert the Chinese immigrants to Protestantism were provided by multiple Protestant churches in Boston, as well as establishing the Young Men's Christian Association.

=== Modern day ===
Chinatown remains a center of Asian American life in New England, hosting many Chinese and Vietnamese restaurants and markets. Chinatown is one of Boston's most densely populated residential districts, with over 28,000 people per square mile in the year 2000. Nearly 70% of Chinatown's population is Asian, compared with Boston's nine percent of Asian Americans overall. Chinatown has a median household income of $14,289.

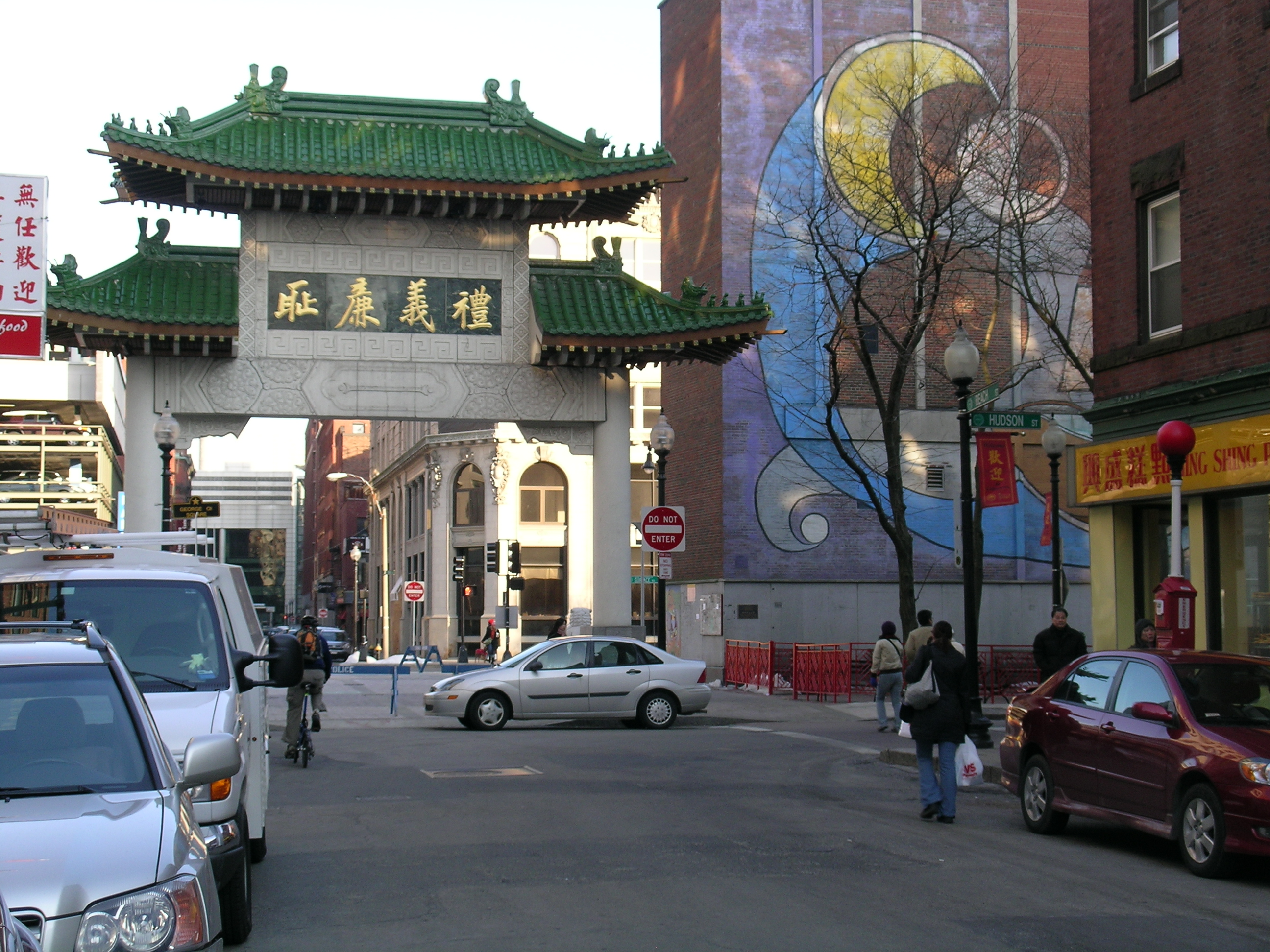
A view from within Chinatown looking towards the paifang

The traditional Chinatown Gate (paifang) with a foo lion on each side is located at the intersection of Beach Street and Surface Road. This was once a run-down area, housing little more than a ventilation-fan building for the Central Artery Tunnel; however, a garden was constructed at this site as part of the Big Dig project. The Gate is visible from the South Station Bus Terminal, and is a popular tourist destination and photo opportunity. Offered by the Taiwanese government to the City in 1982, the gate is engraved with two writings in Chinese: Tian Xia Wei Gong, a saying attributed to Sun Yat-sen that translates as "everything under the sky is for the people", and Li Yi Lian Chi, the four societal bonds of propriety, justice, integrity, and honor.

As of 2000, an area near Chinatown, located at the mouth of an expressway tunnel, was also a red light district. Starting in 2005, community-based civilian "Crime Watch" volunteers patrol the streets every day to discourage and report crime. Chinatown had issues with gang activity. In 1991, Ping On gang members killed five men and wounded a sixth man at a gambling den in the Boston Chinatown massacre. Two of the three gunmen were arrested in China in 1998, extradited to the United States in 2001, and were sentenced to life imprisonment in 2005. The area's crime rate has since declined dramatically.

There are three newspapers that are popular among the residents of Chinatown. One is the World Journal Newspaper, which is the largest, most influential Chinese daily newspaper in the United States. There is also the Sing Tao Daily Newspaper, which is published out of New York and the Boston branch has been in Chinatown for over 40 years. There is also the non-profit community newspaper, Sampan published twice a month which provides both English-language and Chinese-language news and information about Chinatown.

== Cuisine ==
Chinese cuisine in Boston reflects a mélange of multiple influential factors. A large Fujianese immigrant population lives in Boston; therefore, Fuzhou cuisine is readily available in Boston. The Vietnamese population has also influenced the cuisine. Innovative dishes incorporating chow mein and chop suey as well as farm-to-table produce and regionally procured seafood ingredients are found in Chinese as well as non-Chinese food in and around Boston.

== Transportation ==
The MBTA Orange Line stops at the Chinatown station and the Tufts Medical Center station, located within and at the southern edge of the district, respectively. Boylston station on the MBTA Green Line is located just beyond the northwest corner of Chinatown. Just east of Chinatown, South Station is served by the MBTA's Red Line, Silver Line, and Commuter Rail. South Station also accommodates Amtrak, the long-distance rail to New York City and other cities on the Northeast Corridor. Entrance and exit ramps serving Interstate 93 and the Massachusetts Turnpike are at the southern edge of Chinatown.

The South Station Bus Terminal handles regional buses to New England, New York City, Washington, D.C., Albany (New York), and other destinations. The New England destinations include Concord (New Hampshire) and Portland (Maine). The regional and national bus companies include Greyhound Lines, Peter Pan Bus Lines, and Megabus.

== Health care ==
Tufts Medical Center occupies a large portion of the area, and includes a full service hospital and various health-related schools of Tufts University including Tufts University School of Medicine, Tufts University Graduate School of Biomedical Sciences, Gerald J. and Dorothy R. Friedman School of Nutrition Science and Policy, and Tufts University School of Dental Medicine.

In addition, South Cove Community Health Center operates the Chinatown Clinic at 885 Washington Avenue. Volunteers founded South Cove in 1972 to provide better health care for Asian Americans in the Chinatown area.

== Community organizations ==
=== Boston Chinatown Neighborhood Center ===
The Chinatown Neighborhood Center (BCNC) is a community center that primarily serves the immigrant Chinese community of Chinatown. The BCNC's mission is to ensure that the children, youth, and families they serve have the resources and support to achieve greater economic success and social well-being, by providing child care, bilingual education, and youth recreation programs. BCNC strives to provide the support and resources needed for participants to integrate into American society, while preserving the community's rich culture. Most of those served are immigrant Chinese, with low family incomes and limited English ability. In 2014, The Boston Foundation donated nearly $500,000 to support many summer programs and activities in the greater Boston Area, including funding for the BCNC.

BCNC is located in the heart of Chinatown at 3 sites. The 885 Washington Street BCNC is part of the Josiah Quincy School building. In 2005, BCNC created a permanent home at 38 Ash Street, in a five-story community center, which was the first certified green building in Chinatown. The building meets the performance standards under the LEED Green Building Rating System. In 2017, the Pao Arts Center located at 99 Albany Street was opened in partnership with Bunker Hill Community College (BHCC), which also teaches a number of introductory courses there in subjects such as accounting, food service, business, writing, psychology, statistics, and acting. Located in the Charlestown neighborhood of Boston, BHCC is connected to Chinatown by the MBTA Orange Line, and serves a large number of students from Chinatown at its main campus.

The BCNC is also known for its annual Oak Street Fair, occurring every autumn to celebrate Chinese culture in Boston's Chinatown. The event is aimed at children and families, and includes a variety of activities.

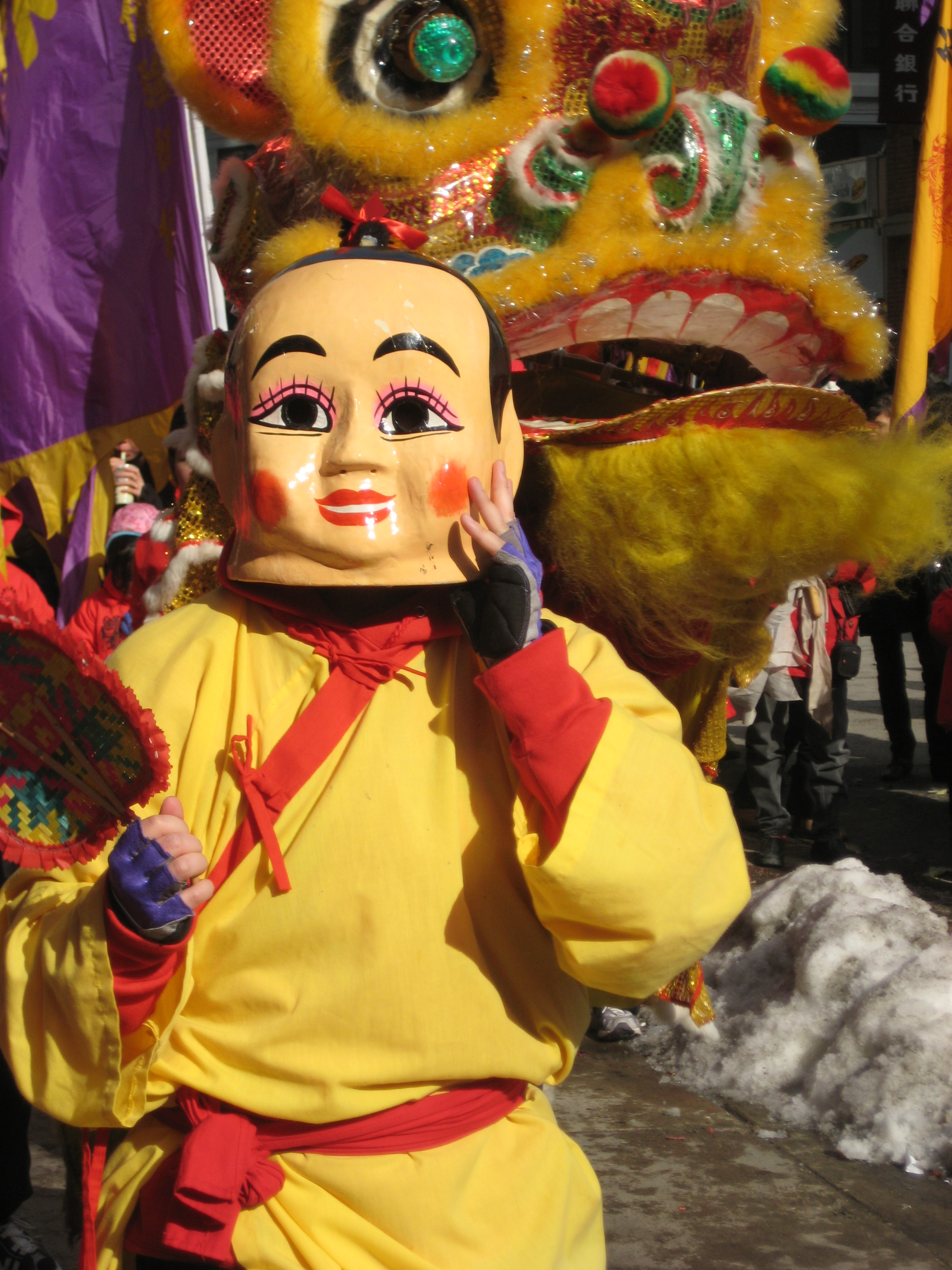
Chinese New Year festival in Boston's Chinatown, 2009

=== Other organizations ===
The Chinatown Lantern Cultural and Educational Center was formed by the Chinatown Cultural Center Committee (CCCC) in order to address the longtime lack of a public library in the neighborhood (the Chinatown branch of the Boston Public Library was demolished in 1956 to make way for the Central Artery). The Reading Room opened in April 2012, and provided library services, educational workshops, and cultural events to the Chinatown community. The Reading Room had a rotating collection of approximately 8,000 books in both English and Chinese, and also ran a small art exhibit gallery. The Reading Room closed on Feb 25, 2013.

The Chinatown community and extended communities of Chinese around Greater Boston (including North Quincy and Wollaston in Quincy) are serviced by the Asian Community Development Corporation. The ACDC helps preserve Chinatown's culture, and foster youth and economic development. It was established in 1987 and since its inception has worked on addressing housing development concerns (such as the notable 2002 Big Dig construction) to gain back a piece of land lost due to urban renewal called the Parcel 24.

In 2006, Boston's Mayor Menino opened up land formerly owned by the BRA (Boston Redevelopment Authority). It became a new home to the nonprofit organization Asian American Civic Association (AACA) and the Kwong Kow Chinese School (KKCS). These two groups teamed up on this project to build an education center, which includes a day care center, a community room, classrooms, and office space.

There are many more organizations in the Chinatown area of Boston which provide community outreach and resources such as the Wang YMCA of Chinatown, the Chinese Progressive Association, and many grassroots organizations such as the Campaign to Protect Chinatown. There are over 75 organizations in Chinatown, and most are ethnically based. Chinatown has always focused on organizations for the youth such as the YMCA, Marching Band, and Boy Scouts. In the 1930s, there was even a major development for culture and support for women and Chinese American girls.

== Urban policies ==
One of the major difficulties facing Boston's Chinatown is the issue of gentrification. Construction of new housing and the repair of existing housing may occur, but if rental and purchase prices increase, existing residents will be displaced. As property prices rising, the demographics of an area may change, and this partly explains why Chinatown is seeing more and more non-Asians and white residents.

Chinatown faces several major issues including: the upkeep of houses, keeping trash off the streets, and keeping the place up to date. With parts of Chinatown looking like they are falling apart, it almost implies a historical struggle for survival. According to Kairos Shen, a planner for the Boston Redevelopment Authority (BRA), "the fact that so many Asians — roughly 5,000 residents, according to US Census data, with the vast majority of them Chinese —– still call Chinatown home is no accident, resulting from a decades-long effort by the city to find a right balance between providing affordable housing and encouraging development projects aimed at revitalizing the neighborhood." The idea for Chinatown is to provide more affordable housing to make it seem less gentrified. There are already a number of projects that have been worked on and are still being built.

Long time residents fear that they may lose their homes due to construction. One of the main goals of urban policy is to create and sustain businesses in Chinatown so that residents have a place to work. In 2010, The Barr Foundation granted Sustainable Chinatown $100,000 for a community led effort to "green" local businesses, in partnership with the Boston Redevelopment Authority, the city, and the Asian American Civic Association (AACA). The effort was intended as a "project to help Chinatown businesses address the issues of rising energy, water, and solid waste management costs by providing practical and affordable solutions to help business owners save money and reduce environmental impacts, while building long term sustainable business expertise capacity in the community."

Community involvement and programs in Chinatown help jobs and community organizations. As of October 2014, many Boston residents, including Chinatown residents, received aid for jobs and support. As referenced by the BRA, "All told more than 200 Boston residents will receive job training under these grants." Many places and businesses in Chinatown received funding through this grant. The AACA received $50,000 and the Boston Chinatown Neighborhood Center (BCNC) received $50,000 as well. Additionally, the YMCA, which many Chinatown residents use, received $50,000. Many projects have been and are still in works in Chinatown, such as the 120 Kingston Street development (240 units), the Hong Kok House at 11-31 Essex Street (75 assisted living units), Kensington Place at 659-679 Washington Street (390 units and retail space), and Parcel 24 on Hudson Street (345 units), among others.

== Buildings ==
As of 2016, Chinatown is experiencing gentrification. Large, luxury residential towers are built in and surrounding an area that was predominantly small three-to-five story apartment buildings intermixed with retail and light-industrial spaces. A property developer has purchased the Dainty Dot Hosiery building, which is listed in the National Register of Historic Places, with plans to transform it into condominiums. Chinese community organizations, such as the Asian Community Development Corporation, are also building housing developments which offer mixed-and low-income housing.

The Hayden Building, located on 681-683 Washington Street, is a historic building designed by Henry Hobson Richardson. Originally constructed in 1875, the Hayden Building remains one of the last commercial stores for retail in Boston's Chinatown, and is the last remaining one built by Richardson. It was added to the National Historic Register in 1980.The building was purchased by Mayor Menino and the City of Boston in 1993, and has since been restored with the intent of marketing it to tenants as of 2014. On March 1, 2013, Menino, along with Historic Boston Inc., teamed up to revitalize, refurbish and reopen this building with a contribution of $200,000, which is part of the Boston's and Chinatown's trilogy fund. The bottom floor of this building has been redone as a Liberty Bank. In the future, projects costing $5.6 million will be used to turn the upper levels of this building into apartments.

== Businesses and shops ==
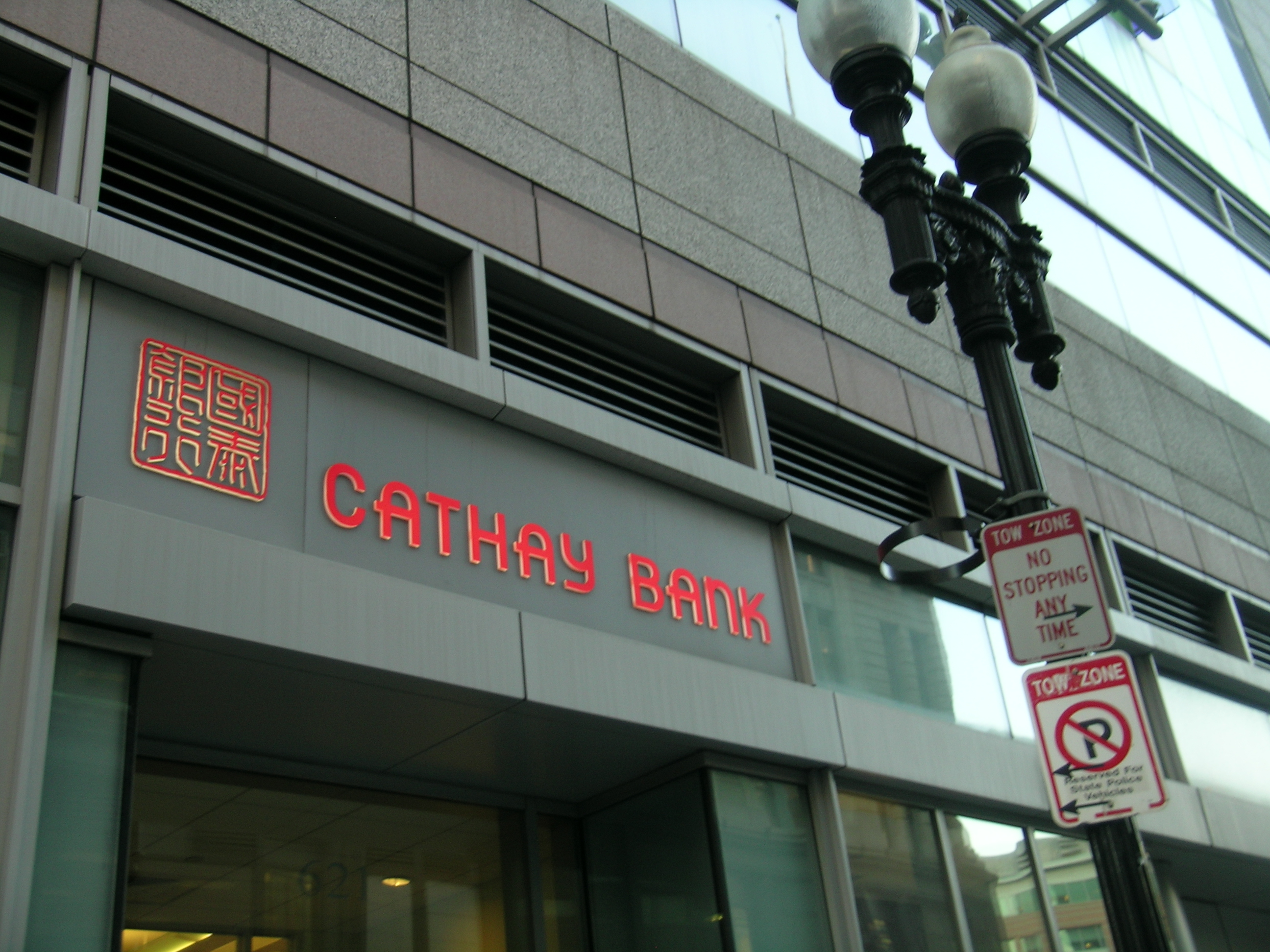
Cathay Bank in Boston's Chinatown, 2008

One of the major reasons tourists visit Chinatown is to see how immigrants live and work today. They can see how the job market has grown as immigrants made a life for themselves from the early markets to the laundries that opened when the settlers first arrived in Chinatown.

Many Boston residents visit restaurants for everyday and special events, occurring either in Chinatown, or in nearby areas such as the Boston Theater District, Financial District, Rose Fitzgerald Kennedy Greenway, Boston Public Gardens, or Boston Common. Food stores in Boston's Chinatown specialize in selling Chinese foods, spices, herbs, and Asian food products. Since 2000, the number of establishments selling specialty Chinese bakery products has increased, with Hong Kong, Taiwanese, and Japanese styles also available.

As one of the last remaining remnants of the area's Historic Garment District, the only textile store still found in Chinatown is Van's Fabric. Founded in the early 1980s, it is one of the community's oldest operating businesses and a pillar of old Chinatown before gentrification began in the area.

== Community events and celebrations ==
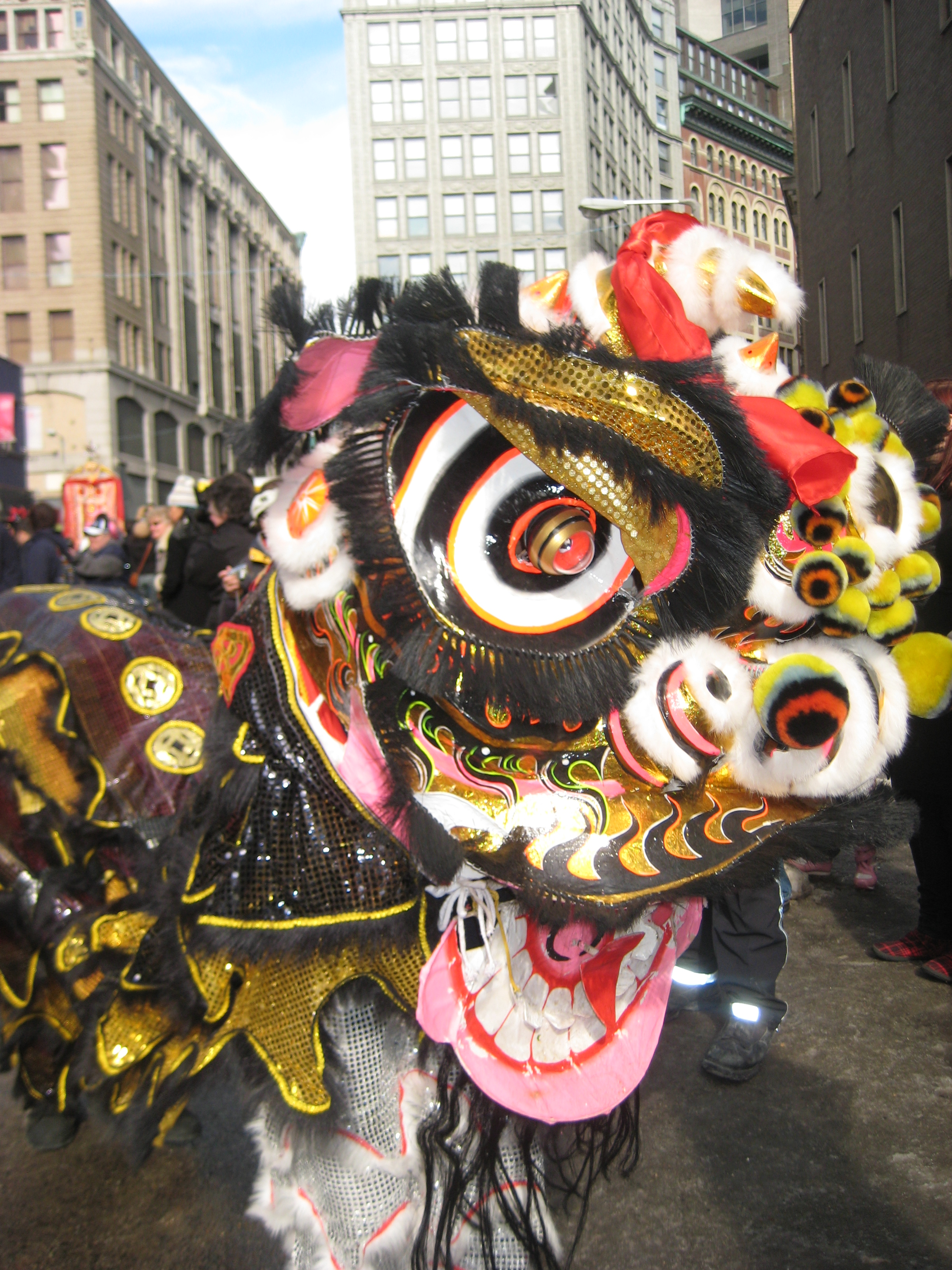
Lion dancer at Chinese New Year festival in Boston's Chinatown

A major part of the culture and history of Chinatown are the events celebrated by the people who live here. There are many community programs and events held in Chinatown annually, but the most noted are the New Years celebration, the Lion Dance Festival, and the August Moon Festival.

One of the biggest festivals of the year celebrated in Chinatown, is the August Moon Festival. This festival is often held in the middle of August and usually lasts for the entire day. During this Festival, there are vendor booths for handmade and traditional Chinese items and plenty of traditional food for sale. Chinese dough art is taught for those interested in learning the art. Additionally the Chinese Opera performs during this time. There is also children's Chinese folk dancing, martial arts performances, and lion dancers from around Chinatown and throughout the world, many who come just for the festival.

Another notable celebration that happens every year in Chinatown is the New Years Parade, also known as the Lion Dance Festival. The Chinese New Year Parade marks the biggest annual celebration in Boston's Chinatown and each year a new animal of the Chinese zodiac is celebrated. The name Lion Dance comes from the costumes worn by those in the parade who often wear lions or dragon costumes. The dance is part of the parade each year. In China, this celebration begins on the first day of the first month in the lunar calendar traditionally used in much of Asia. It is sometimes called the Lunar New Year, but it is different in Boston's Chinatown based on when spring begins.

Another popular event is Fall Cleaning Day, which brings the community together to help clean up trash and litter. It is seen almost as an Earth Day for Chinatown.

Additionally, there is the annual Lantern Festival which is one of the largest tourist attractions and includes Lion Dances, Asian folk dances, martial arts performances, and traditional Chinese singing.

== Satellite Chinatowns ==
A new satellite Chinatown has emerged on Hancock Street in the neighboring city of Quincy, about 10 miles (16 km) to the south of the original Chinatown. This is due to a rapid influx of Hokkien-speaking Mainland Chinese immigrants from the province of Fujian, as well as a large and growing ethnic Vietnamese population. There are already several large Asian supermarkets such as the Kam Man Foods and Super 88 supermarket chains, and other businesses that are competing with Boston's Chinatown. Several businesses operating in Chinatown now have branches in Quincy. The MBTA Red Line connects via either South Station or Downtown Crossing near Boston's Chinatown, to three rapid transit stations in Quincy, including Quincy Center station.

A similar, but much smaller, enclave has developed in Malden to the north of Boston. Malden Center station is directly connected via the MBTA Orange Line to Chinatown station, in the original Chinatown.

== See also ==
- Chinatowns in the United States
- Chinese Progressive Association – Boston Chinese community service organization
- History of the Chinese in Boston
