= Chinese Americans in Boston =

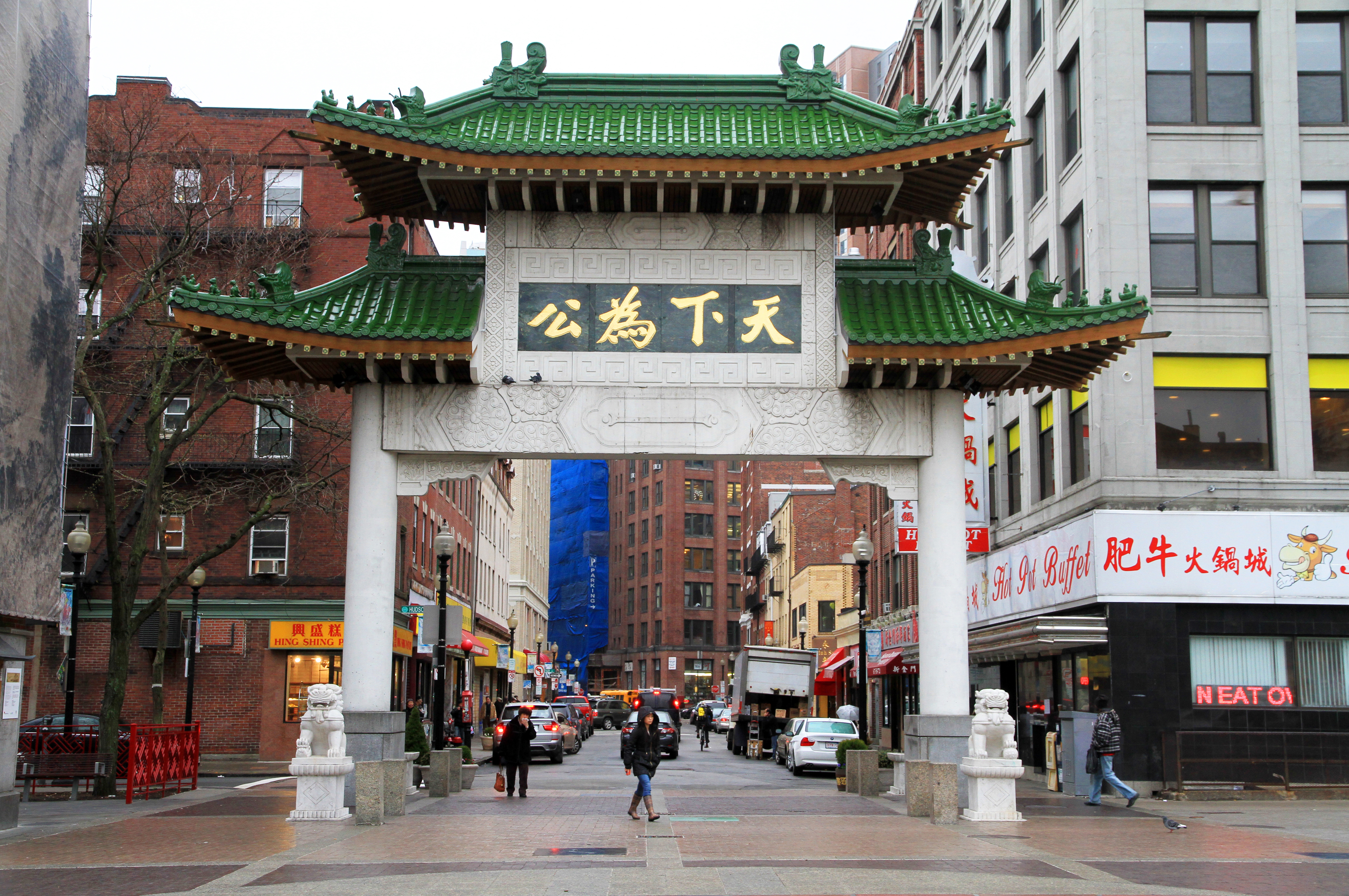
The paifang gate to Boston's Chinatown

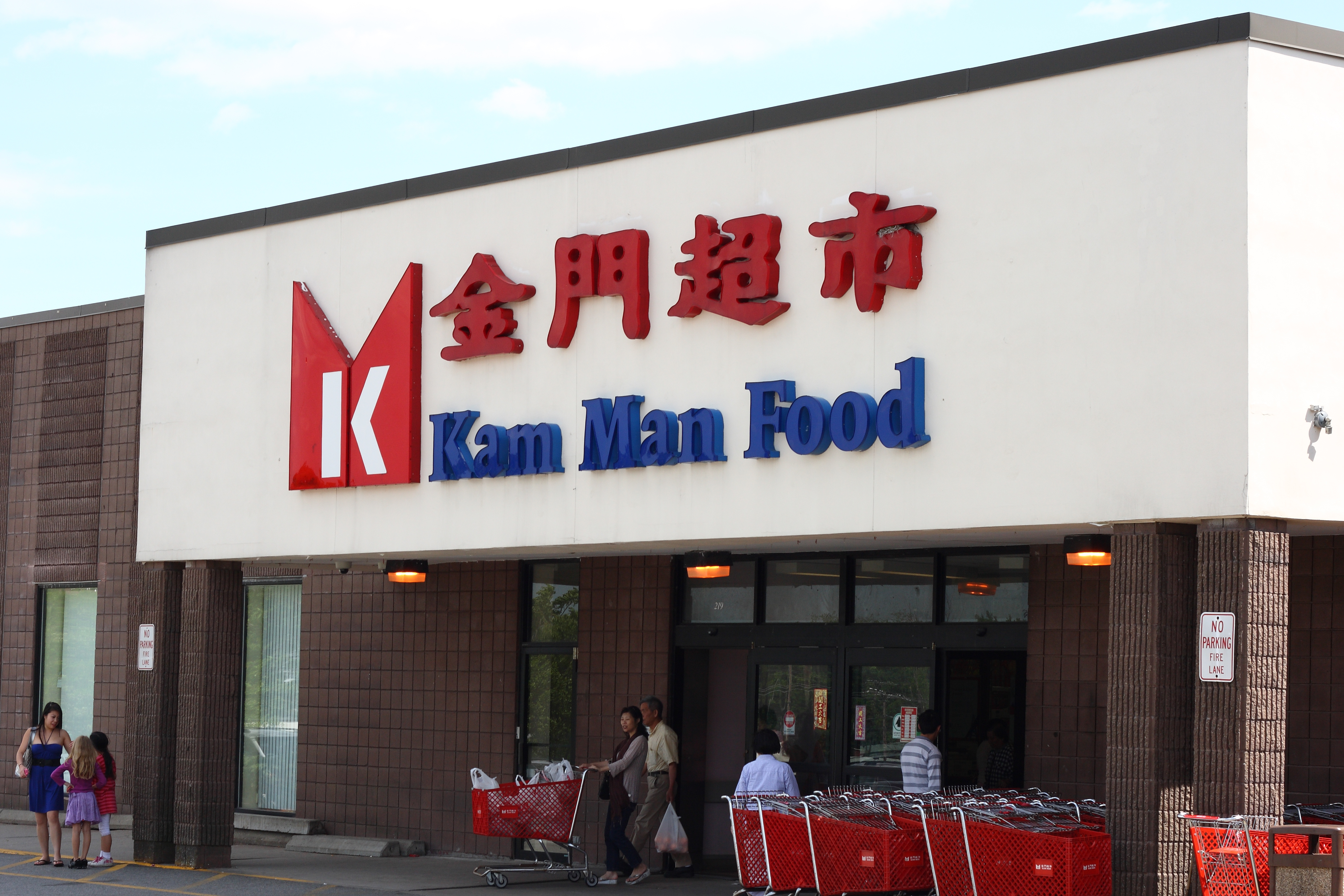
Kam Man Food in Quincy, Massachusetts

The Boston metropolitan area has an active Chinese American community. As of 2013, the Boston Chinatown was the third largest Chinatown in the United States, and there are also Chinese populations in the suburbs of Greater Boston, including Quincy, Malden, Acton, Newton, and Lexington. As of 2006, Boston, Quincy, Malden, Newton, Brookline, and Cambridge house about half of all of the ethnic Chinese in Massachusetts, and as a whole, Chinese constituted the largest Asian ethnic group in the state.

== History ==
In the beginning of the 20th century, most Chinese moving to New England were single men, while some were single women. Historically most Chinese moving to Massachusetts specifically went to the Boston Chinatown and prior to the 1960s the state overall had little Chinese immigration. Immigration from China into the Boston area increased after the Immigration and Nationality Act of 1965 was passed.

During the 1960s, major development projects, including the Massachusetts Turnpike Extension, the Southeast Expressway, and the expansion of the Tufts Medical complex, reduced Chinatown's land area by approximately half even as its population increased by 25 percent.

From 2000 to 2010, the Chinese population of Massachusetts increased by 46%. By 2004 Malden received an influx of second and third generation Chinese moving from Boston and elsewhere. As of 2010 there were almost 123,000 Chinese Americans in all of Massachusetts. By 2011 many Chinese Americans settled in the Boston suburbs, either moving there from Boston or immigrating directly from China to the Boston suburbs.

By 2013, the Boston Chinatown was facing redevelopment and gentrification. The neighborhood's Asian population continued to decline in the following years, with Asian residents accounting for 58 percent of Chinatown's population in 2017, compared with nearly 70 percent in 2000.

== Chinese American businesses ==
Chinese-owned businesses have historically played a role in the development of Boston's Chinatown. In 1921, Ruby Foo opened Ruby Foo's Den at 6 Hudson Street. The Chinese restaurant became known for attracting celebrity customers.

== Demographics ==
As of 2003, about 66% of the Asians in Quincy were ethnic Chinese, giving the city one of the largest Chinese populations in the state. From 2000 to 2010 Quincy's Chinese population increased by almost 60%. Most of the Asian immigrants coming to Quincy in the 1980s originated from Hong Kong and Taiwan, but by 2003 the majority place of origin was Fujian Province in Mainland China. As of 2000 65% of the Chinese in Quincy were homeowners. Historically Quincy residents traveled to shops in the Boston Chinatown but by 2003 Asian shopping centers became established in Quincy. By 2003 New York City-based Kam Man Food was establishing a supermarket in Quincy. Hainan Airlines began non-stop service between Beijing and Logan International Airport in Boston in 2014, followed by non-stop service between Shanghai and Boston in 2015. Cathay Pacific Airways began non-stop service between Hong Kong and Boston in 2015. These non-stop flight services between China and Boston were credited for the ascent of Chinese becoming the top nationality visiting Boston from outside North America, with nearly one in four Chinese visitors coming to Boston for education.

Acton had 2,041 Chinese Americans in 2010, a 151% increase from 2000 and the ninth largest Chinese population in Massachusetts.

In 2000, Malden had 4,504 ethnic Chinese people, making up 57% of the city's Asian population. From 2000 to 2010 the Chinese population of Malden increased by about 50%. Malden Center is situated on the MBTA Orange Line which connects with Boston's Chinatown.

== Institutions ==
The Chinese Progressive Association is located in Boston.

The Boston Chinatown Neighborhood Center, Inc. (BCNC; simplified Chinese: 波士顿华埠社区中心; traditional Chinese: 波士頓華埠社區中心; pinyin: Bōshìdùn huá bù shèqū zhōngxīn) serves Chinese Americans in the region. Its principal site is in the Boston Chinatown, and in 2011 BCNC executive director Elaine Ng stated that the center would begin to offer services in Quincy. The number of persons using BCNC services residing in Quincy increased by almost 300% in a period beginning in 2004 and ending in 2005. Also, Quincy Asian Resources Incorporated (QARI) offers many services and opportunities through their website qariusa.org.

The Workers Assist is a nonprofit organization founded in 2023 and based in Boston's Chinatown. The organization provides English-language education and other community programs for immigrant workers in the Boston area.

== Education ==
Founded in 1916, the Kwong Kow Chinese School is the oldest Chinese-language school in Massachusetts. It offers classes for not only members of the local Chinese American community, but immigrant children of the Philippines, Cambodia, and Vietnam. In 2007, it moved into its permanent home at the Chinese Community Education Center, after many years of moving around Chinatown. As of 2003 1,000 students took classes at the school.

Peter Jae established the Quincy Chinese Language School, which offers supplementary education for Chinese children, in 1988. As of 2003 it holds Cantonese language classes for 150 students at the Sacred Heart School in North Quincy on Saturday mornings. The school at one time had 400 students but the school reduced itself in size when a lack of qualified teachers occurred.

The Chung Yee School is another Chinese school in Quincy. As of 2008 the headmaster is Harry Kwan, who originated from Hong Kong. That year the school had 100 students and charged $100 ($149.54 adjusted for inflation) per child per month for Chinese language and culture after school classes. It was first established around 1996. The school was briefly closed by the Quincy Police Department on November 28, 2008, due to a lack of Massachusetts state and local government permits. After the state and municipal authorities cleared the school of allegations of child abuse, it was scheduled to reopen that year.

In 2003, over 400 students attended classes at the Lexington Chinese School (LCS; 勒星頓中文學校.), held on Sundays. The school holds its classes at Belmont High School in Belmont.

== Recreation ==
The Lunar New Year is celebrated in Quincy, amongst other places.

== Notable people ==
- An Wang
- Michelle Wu
- Donnie Yen
- Harry Hom Dow

== See also ==
- Chinese Americans
- Chinese people in New York City
