= Chinatown, Providence, Rhode Island =

Providence Chinatown
- Neighborhood of Providence
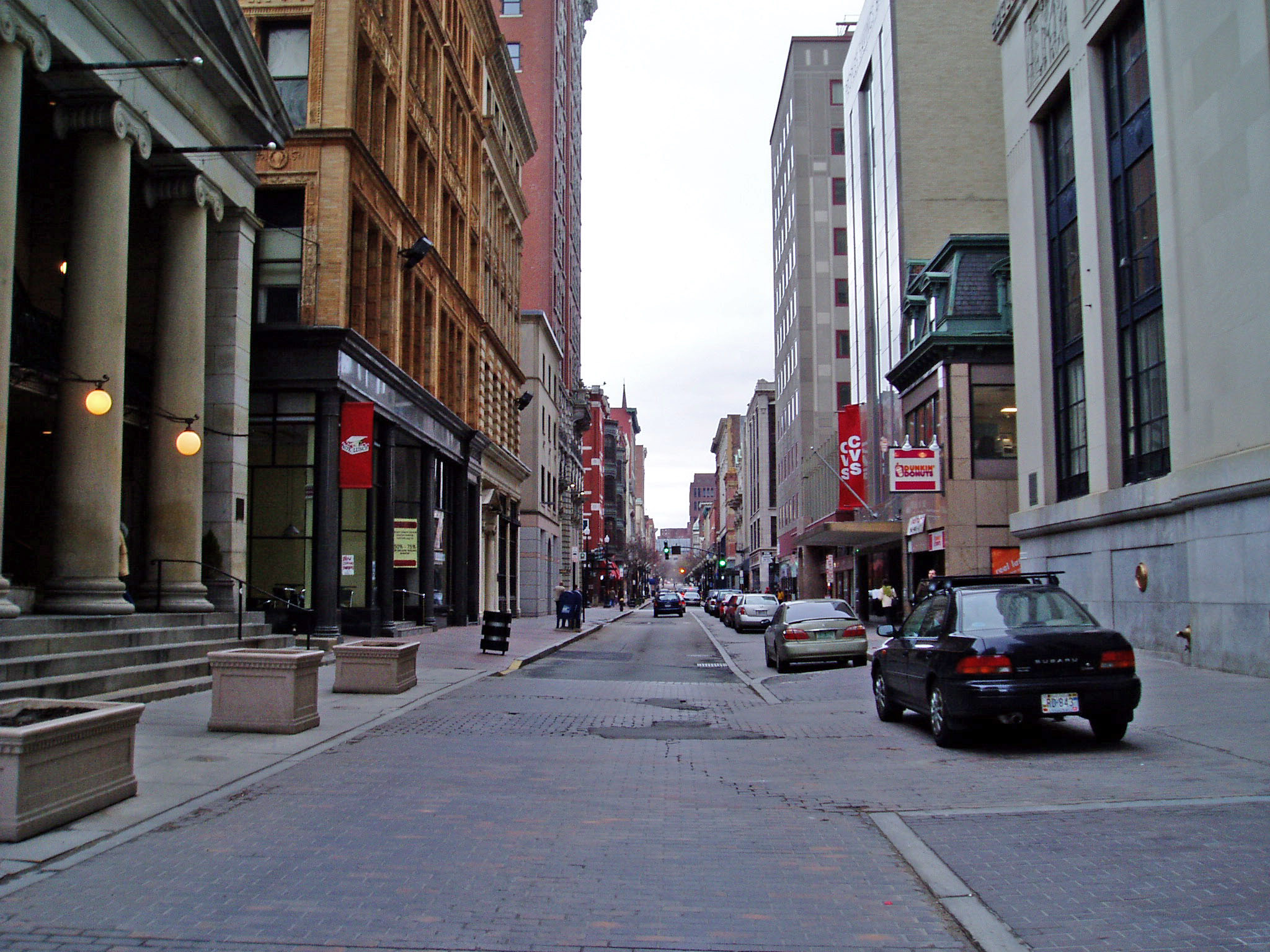
- Location of Chinatown was once near Westminster Street
- Interactive map of Providence Chinatown
- Coordinates: 41°49′25″N 71°25′20″W
- Country: United States
- State: Rhode Island
- County: Providence County
- City: Providence, Rhode Island
- ZIP Code: 02903
- Area code: Area code 401

The U.S. city of Providence, Rhode Island, was once home to at least two Chinatowns, with the first on Burrill Street and the latter on Summer Street after 1915. Collectively, these two settlements marked the existence of a distinct Chinatown in Providence between the late 18th century and the mid 20th century.

The Empire Street Chinatown was considered one of the "last of the old Chinatowns" in a grouping that included Boston, Philadelphia and Baltimore. The extension of Empire Street in 1915 “doomed the Chinatown” (according to the Providence Sunday Journal) and all of the buildings were demolished including the former headquarters of local Chinese societies. The enclave was once located next to the Empire Theatre and the Central Baptist Church.

== History ==
Providence's Chinatown was built in the late 1800s, and disappeared sometime after 1951 according to a historical record of Patrolman Robert Chin, who is notable for being the country's first Chinese-American police officer. He "was raised at 136 Summer Street during the final years of the neighborhood's Chinatown settlement. His parents operated the Far East Noodle Company, which supplied local Chinese restaurants."

Another source said that Chinatown began as a community of Chinese grocery stores, restaurants, boarding houses, and laundries around the early 1890s along Burrill Street (today encompassing the intersection of Empire Street between Westminster and Weybosset Streets). The Chinese Exclusion Act of 1882, a law which disfavored the Chinese race caused the decline of the Chinatown as future immigrants from China were prevented from coming causing the population of the Chinese race within the city to dwindle, along with the rest of the nation, in what was known as the "Yellow Peril." The neighborhood was forced to relocate to nearby Summer Street, causing much of the original Burrill Street Chinatown to be demolished.

The Providence Sunday Journal coverage of the destruction of Chinatown showed contradictory perspectives. A February 16, 1913 article showed hostility towards the Chinese as it stated that the community "... young white girls [were] hanging out at the Chop Suey houses, there subject to the supposedly 'unhealthy' attentions of womanless Chinese men, as well as the discovery of opium and gambling in the neighborhood...." Then on December 13, 1914, the newspaper article "... spoke of the need to extend Empire Street (rather than Snow Street, as had originally been planned) through to Weybosset Street, with the attendant widening that mysteriously required demolition of every building in Chinatown at that time, and which left that block of Empire Street conspicuously wider than its other two blocks...."

Another historical record indicated that Chinese-white couples were prevalent, during an era when interracial couples were generally shunned. The account references an address that was located near a Chinese laundry.
