= Chinese Progressive Association (Boston) =

American non-governmental organization

The Chinese Progressive Association (CPA) is an American non-governmental organization founded in Boston, Massachusetts, in 1977. The CPA is an agency that helps Chinese immigrants assimilate into American culture through citizen classes, English classes, and involvement in local activism. The organization has engaged in political action as the motive force behind Boston's Unemployed Workers Rights Campaign (UWRC) during the decade of the 1980s. Members have also protested for affordable housing in Boston's Chinatown following mass construction of luxury condos. Additionally, in 2014, the CPA has created partnerships with Boston supermarkets in order to bring job opportunities for Asian immigrants into Boston.

== History ==
The Chinese Progressive Association (CPA) was first opened in Boston, Massachusetts, in 1977. The founders of the organization were American-born Chinese youth returning to the community, immigrant workers and retired residents living in New England who longed for a connection to their home country. Today, the CPA consists of fluent Chinese speakers, manual labor workers, and low income families.

The organization was first located in an abandoned garment factory loft in Boston, where many social activities were held such as apple picking, group dinners, and ping pong. Along with the social aspects, the organization also holds citizen classes and youth programs. The CPA strives to create more working opportunities and better, more affordable living environments for Chinese immigrants residing in the greater Boston area.

== Mission ==
The Chinese Progressive Association holds a set of goals for their community. Its founding principles were:

- Unite with and work for the interests of the Chinese community
- Promote friendship between people of the United States and China
- Support other organizations working for the interests of the people

Current literature describes the organization's mission as: The Chinese Progressive Association (CPA) is a grassroots community organization which works for full equality and empowerment of the Chinese community in the Greater Boston area and beyond. Our activities seek to improve the living and working conditions of Chinese Americans and to involve ordinary community members in making decisions that affect our lives.

== Membership and activities ==
In order to become a member of the Chinese Progressive Association, a basic form must be completed. The document asks for contact information, as well as preference on activities. Also, interested parties are asked to list their favorite films and their availability for meeting with other members.

The CPA organizes a variety of activities for its members including community services such as assistance with tax forms and immigration documents. An emphasis is placed on seamlessly assimilating members into American culture. Also, the organization offers its members an opportunity to become involved in community issues such as the displacement and retraining of garment workers. Additionally, many recreational activities are offered including the celebration of film and theatrical performances from China. The goal of this wide range of activities is for Chinese immigrants to feel as though they are equal members of American society while still maintaining the ethnic identity of their heritage.

== Activism ==
=== Affordable housing ===
One of the main issues the Chinese Progressive Association is concerned with is affordable housing in Boston's Chinatown. In 2012, 33 residents were evicted from a large apartment complex, named the See Sun building, due to unfit living conditions. Most of the tenants were elderly and of lower class status. After being evicted, the residents sought public housing but many had difficulty finding an affordable place to live. This has been a recent trend in Chinatown and replacing these affordable rents are new luxury condos, leaving no room for those on a lower income. Specifically, on Chinatown's Washington Street, Millennium Place, a new development is offering condos starting at $1 million.

In February 2014, the CPA led a rally to protest the new luxury condos and gathered 70 Chinatown residents to the event. Many of the activists held banners that stated, 'Remain, Reclaim, Rebuild Boston'. Before the rally ended, participants hung poster boards on the evicted See Sun building and displayed quotes from the residents who were evicted.

=== Health ===
The Chinese Progressive Association does grassroots level research and work to protect the health of low-wage workers and communities of color. They acknowledge the fact that many come to America because they believe that it gives them a better life, but they often fall through the cracks of the system and do not get the media attention they deserve. Due to this, CPA creates publications and data reports, called community-based participatory research, to educate people of the little-known stories of the low-income and working-class immigrant Chinese community in San Francisco. Several of these reports showcase that many immigrant workers are struggling to survive in sweatshop-level working conditions that are often hazardous and stressful. CPA is advocating for healthier jobs for immigrant restaurant workers in San Francisco’s Chinatown.

=== Wage theft ===
CPA fights against restaurant workers paid below minimum wage, denied overtime pay, deducted pay when sick, and not paid at all. They believe that, even though labor laws exist, they are not enforced enough. In their 2010 report, they revealed that almost 60% of workers reported wage theft in one way or another and 1 in 2 workers received less than minimum wage. CPA called for a Wage Theft Task Force after the report and the San Francisco Board of Supervisors created the taskforce on June 12, 2012, to address their concerns amidst others addressed by various community organizations.

=== Job opportunities ===
Along with affordable housing, the CPA has been active in providing job opportunities for Chinese immigrants in the Boston area through their Workers Center, founded in 1987. After factories in Chinatown had been closed down, unemployment skyrocketed in the area, specifically for women. In 1989 the unemployment for Chinese women in Boston was double that of other women workers in the area. The CPA along with other organizations, worked to increase the unemployment benefits. This was all part of the 1989 Unemployed Workers Rights Campaign, which strived to create more job opportunities for the unemployed. In 1989, Chinese immigrants rallied at Boston's State House to try to get Legislature to reform unemployment benefits. The goal of the activists was to call for the support of two bills. One would increase the unemployment rate and the other would require that translators were hired at the Department of Employment Training for non-English speakers

In 2014, the CPA led an effort to provide Chinatown and South End residents with job opportunities in new stores in the area. The group worked with City Councilor, Ayanna Pressley, and the City Office of Economic Development to initiate goals for local hiring and establish a multilingual application and interview process. The CPA, specifically, partnered with the new Whole Foods Market in the South End, and worked with the company in order to create opportunities for Chinatown residents. By 2015, Whole Foods market hired 108 new employees, 26% of which were Chinese Americans working at a $11 per hour rate. Lydia Lowe, the director of the Chinese Progressive Association stated that the reason behind the success of this partnership was the clear monitoring and reporting that went on during the collaboration. Also, she highlighted the importance of the multilingual application process that allowed immigrants to communicate and fully showcase their skills and talents. The CPA's collaboration with Whole Foods will extend beyond the new hiring opportunities. The supermarket provides English classes for immigrants and customer service training for their employees.

== See also ==
- Chinese Americans in Boston
