= Kwong Kow Chinese School =

Coordinates: 42°20′55.77″N 71°3′42.22″W

Kwong Kow Chinese School (KKCS; 中華廣教學校) is a supplementary school located in Chinatown, Boston. Founded in 1916 for immigrants in Chinatown, as Qwong Kow Chinese School, it has offered classes for not only members of the local Chinese American community, but immigrant children from Hong Kong, Taiwan, the Philippines, Cambodia, and Vietnam. In 2007, it moved into its permanent home at the Chinese Community Education Center, after many years of moving around Chinatown.
