= Vietnamese Americans in Boston =

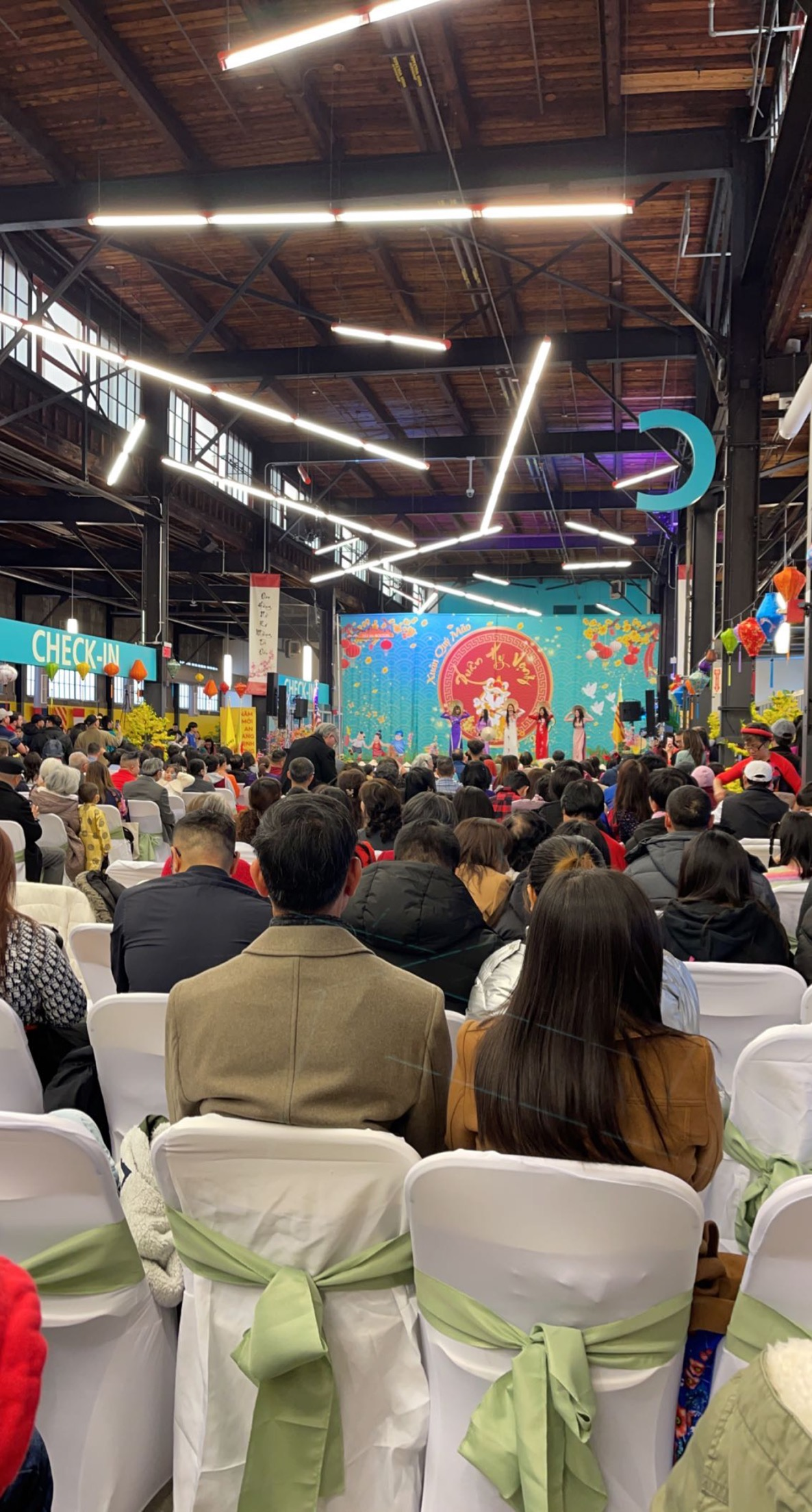
This is a Tet in Boston live performance in recognition of the year of the cat. This event took place on Sunday, January 15th, 2023 at Flynn Cruiseport.

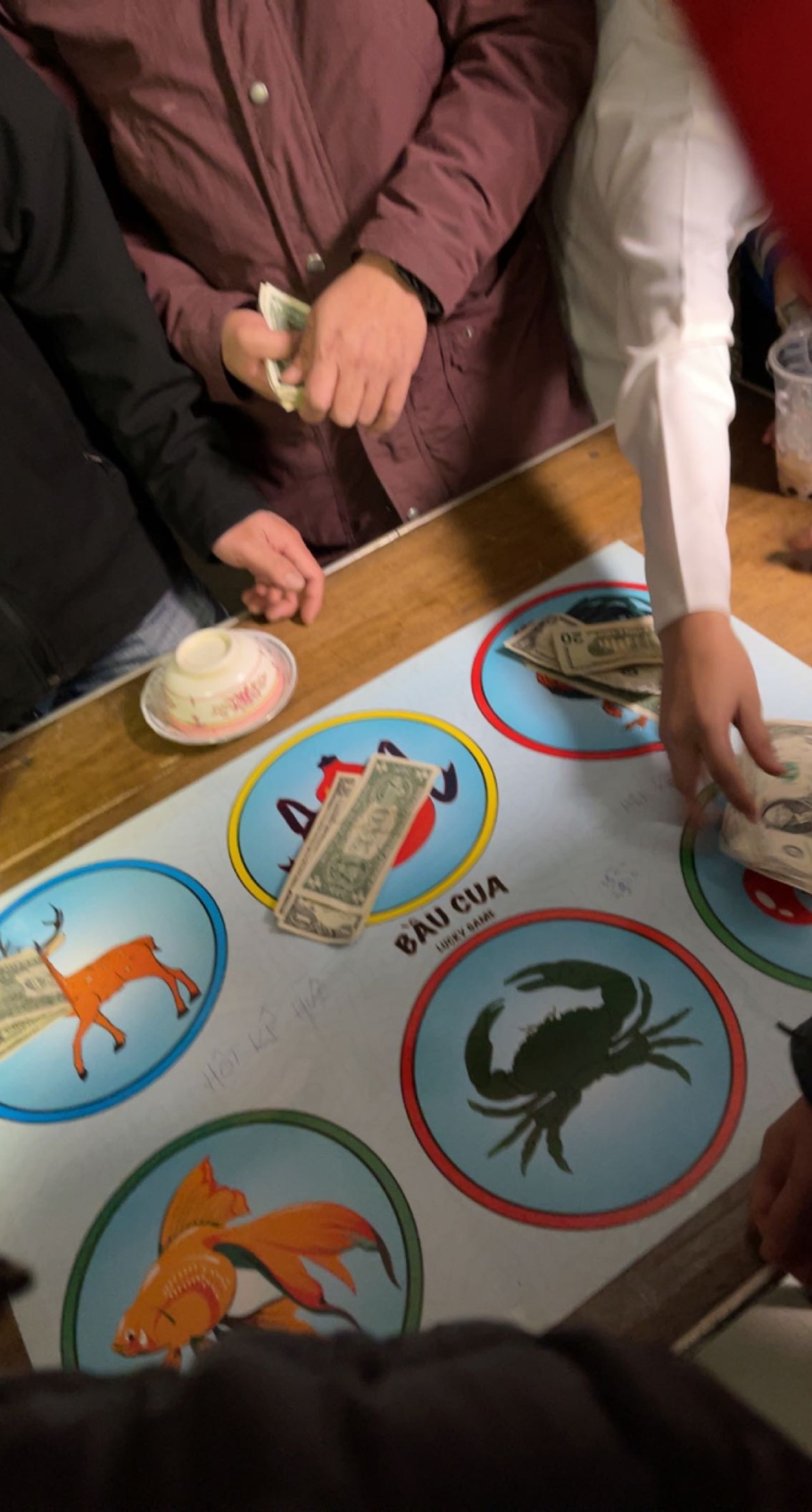
This is a Vietnamese Gambling game called Bau Cua. This game is typically played around New Years.

There is a large Vietnamese American population in Boston. As of 2012, Boston has the largest group of ethnic Vietnamese in Massachusetts. Other groups of Vietnamese are in Braintree, Chelsea, Everett, Lynn, Malden, Medford, Quincy, Randolph, Revere, and Weymouth. Vietnamese also live in more distant cities in the Boston combined statistical area and the area around Boston: Attleboro, Brockton, Fall River, Haverhill, Methuen, Lowell and Worcester.

== History ==
After the Vietnam War ended in 1975, refugees from Vietnam settled amongst many states, one of which includes Boston. Many early refugees fled by boat due to fear of political persecution. These people are called Vietnamese Boat People.

By 1992 some Vietnamese gangs were active in the Boston area.

== Demographics ==
In 2000 there were 1,112 ethnic Vietnamese in Lynn, an increase by over 91% from the 1990 figures. The same year there were 876 ethnic Vietnamese in Malden, an increase by 187% from the 1990 figures.

From the years 2015 to 2020, there has been a 6.81% increase in the Vietnamese population living in Massachusetts. According to data from the U.S. Census, Dorchester has the largest Vietnamese population in Massachusetts.There were 53,700 Vietnamese living in Boston in 2018.

== Geography ==
The Fields Corner area of Dorchester has a large concentration of Vietnamese people. In May 2021, a section of Fields Corner was designated as the Boston Little Saigon Cultural District.

Boston Little Saigon is a cultural district located in Dorchester that strives to promote recognition towards Vietnamese culture and community amongst local families in Boston through events, arts, and humanities. Boston Little Saigon offers a community program where they support small businesses and non-profit organizations in areas for improvement and marketing services.

Fields Corner, located in Dorchester is home to 75% of the Vietnamese Americans in Boston. Around the area, you can find many Vietnamese owned businesses such as bakeries, restaurants, boba shops, jewelry stores and many more. There is also the Luc Hoa Buddhist Center and Temple.

== Institutions & Organizations ==
Originally founded in 1994 by a group of Vietnamese refugees and immigrants, the organization VietAID provides a wide range of services to Vietnamese people living in the Boston area. A few services include summer camp, a preschool and after school program, and many more. VietAID is located in the heart of Dorchester. More so often, this community center was the first ever such center in the United States to provide bilingual services and opportunities to enrich the lives of Vietnamese people through culture and traditional events.

Founded in 1984 by An Ngo, with the mission statement of “Promoting family self-sufficiency and well being, and to facilitate community empowerment among Boston's Vietnamese population”; VACA (Vietnamese American Civic Association) is an organization located in Dorchester, well known for their extensive community outreach services provided for the Vietnamese Community in Boston. Many free services that the organization offers include translation, English learning courses (ESOL), healthcare applications, legal paperwork and many more. VACA is designated to set aid between ordinary individuals and resources at the top.

Boston’s Networking Organization for Vietnamese Americans (NOVA) is a non profit that strives to connect and involve Vietnamese people towards their community. They host many events such as the Tet Trung Thu and the Dragon Boat festival; alongside providing services to teach Vietnamese language, and set a foundation for immigrants and others to feel comfortable embracing Vietnamese culture.

== Churches and Temples ==
St. Ambrose Parish is a Catholic church located in Dorchester. They provide many religious services for Vietnamese Americans such as weddings and baptism. The first Vietnamese American Pastor in the history of Boston is the lead of the church.

Chua Vietnam is a Vietnamese Buddhist temple located in Roslindale that was founded in 1986. This temple became the first permanent place of worship for Vietnamese Buddhists around the area. The temple offers many services such as teaching Vietnamese language, medication techniques, tradition, and many more.

== Cultural Events ==
Tet in Boston is an inclusive event that aims to celebrate the Lunar New Year, "preserve and promote Vietnamese and Vietnamese-American culture, provide an opportunity for companies and organizations to promote products and services, raise funds to support educational and cultural programs, and provide an opportunity for youth involvement." Many activities include live performances, lion dancing, fashion shows, picture booths, mini games, and many more. The event takes place either a week before or after Lunar New Year's Day.

Tet Trung Thu & Night Market is a Mid-Autumn Moon Festival that is hosted by Nova Boston, an organization that provides resources for Vietnamese Americans and their communities. The event takes place sometime in September and it’s arranged as Town Field Park in Dorchester. Everyone is welcomed to see live performances, play a variety of mini-games and enjoy a wide selection of food hosted by local businesses.

== Occupations ==
As of 2017, 26% of Vietnamese males are in the Production & Transportation & Moving Industry.

As of 2017, 33% of Vietnamese females are in the Healthcare Support & Personal Care Industry.

As of 2017, many self-employed Vietnamese businesses fall between the Nail Salons business, Beauty Shops, and Construction.

Many Vietnamese Americans have developed entrepreneurial spirits in Boston.
