= Boston Chinatown immigration raid =

The Boston Chinatown immigration raids refers to an incident on October 11, 1903, in Chinatown, Boston where immigration officials arrested 234 Chinese Americans for not being able to produce their papers in time for officials. While forty-five people were actually found to be in the country illegally, the raids occurred during a time of anti-Chinese sentiment. Many of those wrongly picked up by the police had their white wives and black friends help produce their papers, showing the multiracial aspects of the community.
